= Coat of arms of Australia =

Commonwealth Coat of Arms
- Armiger: Commonwealth of Australia
- Adopted: 19 September 1912
- Crest: The Commonwealth Star: A seven-pointed star, or (gold)
- Torse: Or and azure (blue)
- Shield: see below
- Supporters: Dexter (left) a red kangaroo, Sinister (right) an emu, both proper (natural colours)
- Compartment: none, golden wattle is depicted in commonly used versions
- Motto: none, the name of the country is written on a scroll in commonly used versions
- Earlier version: 1908–1912 version
- Designer: William Gullick

The coat of arms of Australia, officially the Commonwealth Coat of Arms, is a formal symbol of the Commonwealth of Australia. It depicts a shield, containing symbols of Australia's six states, and is held up by native Australian animals, the kangaroo and the emu. The seven-pointed Commonwealth Star surmounting the crest also represents the states and territories, while golden wattle, the national floral emblem, appears below the shield.

The first arms were authorised by King Edward VII on 7 May 1908, and the current version by King George V on 19 September 1912, although the 1908 version continued to be used in some contexts, notably appearing on the reverse of the sixpenny coin.

== Design ==
The escutcheon of the arms

=== Escutcheon ===
The escutcheon (central shield) is the focal point of the coat of arms, and contains six quarters, each containing a representation of the badge of an Australian state. The whole shield is surrounded by an ermine border, which both symbolises the "encompassing authority of the Australian crown" and makes the shield a single device, instead of a collection of separate emblems. Historian Bruce Baskerville suggests the arms reflect the preamble of the Australian Constitution:

The people of each state are signified by their state badges, the federation established under the constitution by the equal distribution of the quarters, and the crown by the ermine border. The public authority represented by the arms symbolises the intangible, but limited, public authority of the Commonwealth and its vesting in a sort of mystical fusion of people, crown and constitution.

In the top half, from left to right, the states represented are New South Wales, Victoria and Queensland. In the bottom half, from left to right: South Australia, Western Australia, and Tasmania.

=== Commonwealth Star ===
Above the shield is the seven-pointed Commonwealth Star or Star of Federation above a blue and gold wreath, forming the crest. Six of the points on the star represent the original six states, while the seventh point represents the territories.

=== Supporters ===
The red kangaroo and emu that support the shield have never been designated as official animal emblems of the nation. They owe their unofficial recognition to the fact that they are endemic Australian fauna (found only on that continent), and likely chosen because they are the most well-known native Australian animals large enough to be positioned together in scale holding up the shield. They symbolise progress and the nation moving forward as neither animal can easily walk backwards. Director of the Parliament House Art Collection, Justine Van Mourik has claimed that the kangaroo is, and must be seen to be, male, and this requirement led to an interpretation by John Coburn of the coat of arms for Parliament House to be rejected.

=== Background ===
In the background is a wreath of golden wattle, the official national floral emblem, though the representation of the species is not botanically accurate. At the bottom is a scroll that contains the name of the nation. While almost always depicted, these elements are technically optional artistic flourishes as they are not described in the royal warrant for the arms.

| State | Badge | Description |
|---|---|---|
| New South Wales | | the cross of St. George with lion and stars |
| Victoria | | St Edward's Crown and Southern Cross |
| Queensland | | a blue Maltese cross and St Edward's Crown |
| South Australia | | the Australian piping shrike |
| Western Australia | | a black swan |
| Tasmania | | a red lion passant |

=== Blazon ===
The official blazon of the Commonwealth was included in a royal warrant of King George V on 19 September 1912, that officially granted the arms. The blazon is as follows:

Quarterly of six, the first quarter Argent a Cross Gules charged with a Lion passant guardant between on each limb a Mullet of eight points Or; the second Azure five Mullets, one of eight, two of seven, one of six and one of five points of the first (representing the Constellation of the Southern Cross) ensigned with an Imperial Crown proper; the third of the first a Maltese Cross of the fourth, surmounted by a like Imperial Crown; the fourth of the third, on a Perch wreathed Vert and Gules an Australian Piping Shrike displayed also proper; the fifth also Or a Swan naiant to the sinister Sable; the last of the first, a Lion passant of the second, the whole within a Bordure Ermine; for the Crest on a Wreath Or and Azure A Seven-pointed Star Or, and for Supporters dexter a Kangaroo, sinister an Emu, both proper.

The following is the blazon for the 1908 coat of arms:

Azure on an Inescutcheon Argent upon a Cross of St. George cottised of the field five six pointed Stars of the second (representing the Constellation of the Southern Cross) all within an Orle of Inescutcheons of the second, each charged with a Chevron Gules, And for the Crest on the wreath of the Colours A seven pointed star Or—And for supporters On a compartment of grass to the dexter, a Kangaroo, to the sinster an Emu both proper, together with the motto "Advance Australia".

== History ==
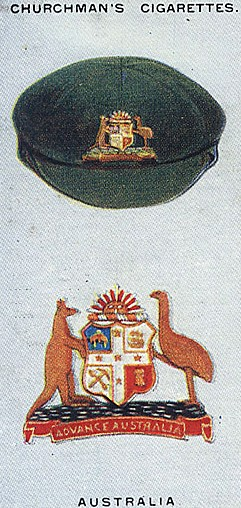
The unofficial colonial arms as depicted on a baggy green

Commonwealth Coat of Arms 1908–1912
- Adopted: 7 May 1908
- Relinquished: 19 September 1912
- Crest: Commonwealth Star
- Torse: Argent and azure
- Shield: Azure on an Inescutcheon Argent upon a Cross of St. George cottised of the field five six pointed Stars of the second (representing the Constellation of the Southern Cross) all within an Orle of Inescutcheons of the second, each charged with a Chevron Gules
- Supporters: Red kangaroo and emu, both proper
- Compartment: Grassy field proper
- Motto: Advance Australia
- Designer: Wilson Dobbs

By the 1820s, an unofficial coat of arms consisting of a shield depicting four symbols of commerce (a golden fleece, ship, anchor and wheat), supported by a kangaroo and emu with the motto "Advance Australia" was widely used across the eastern colonies of Australia. It appeared on buildings and personal goods as a branding device for Australia. These later formed the basis of the arms of New South Wales, Melbourne and Adelaide. These arms were also used on the baggy green caps used by the Australian Cricket team from at least 1899. The unofficial arms still remain in use on the caps today.

=== 1908 Arms ===
Following the federation of Australia, the first official coat of arms of Australia was designed by Wilson Dobbs and granted by King Edward VII on 7 May 1908.

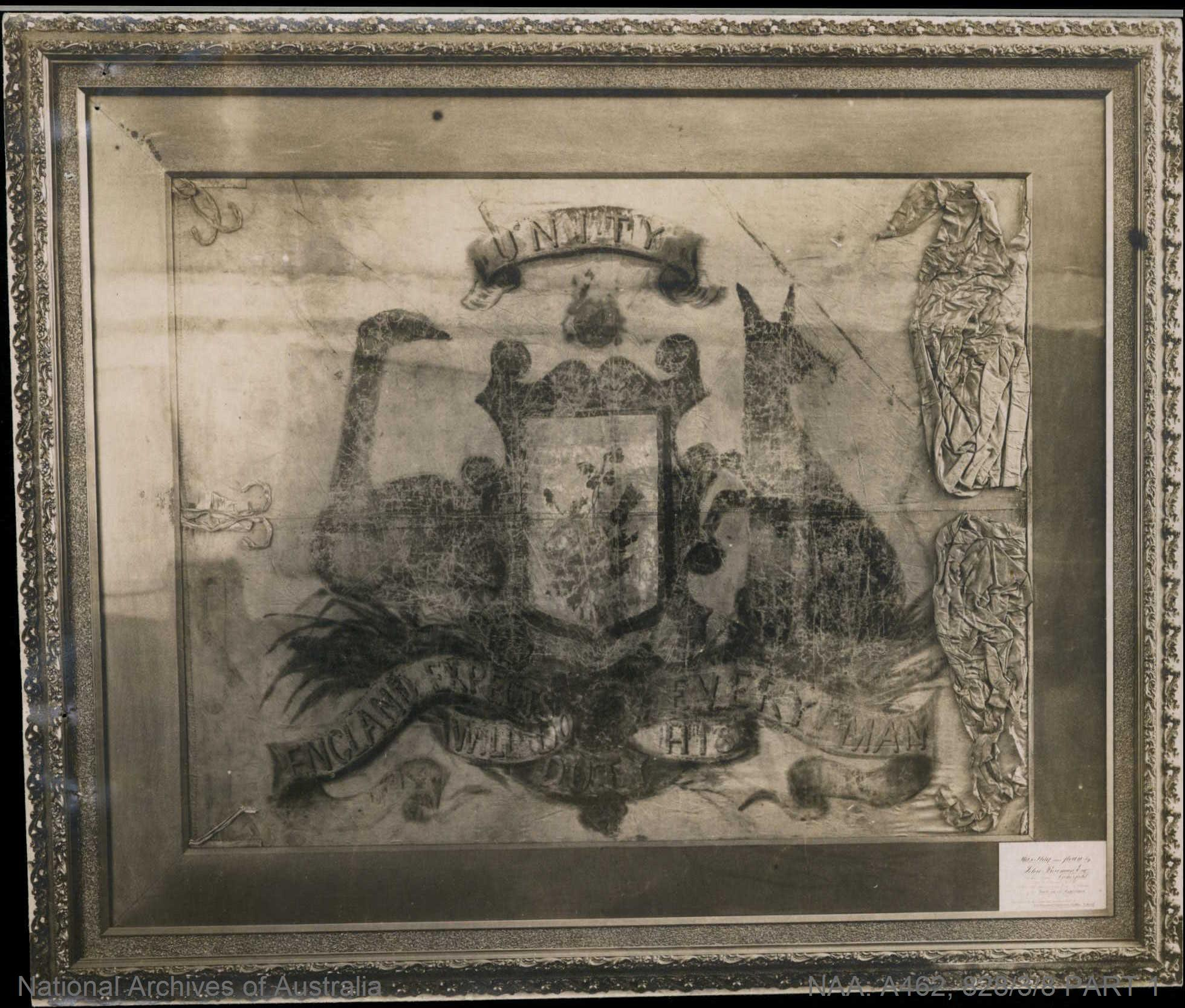
Original Bowman flag

It consisted of a shield in the centre, the seven pointed star on a wreath as the crest above it, and a kangaroo and an emu using its foot to help the kangaroo to support the shield, all on a bed of green grass with a scroll containing the motto "Advance Australia" (the same motto as the unofficial colonial arms). The selection of the kangaroo, the emu and the words, "Advance Australia" were tied together symbolically. The shield had a white background, with a red cross of Saint George, blue lines outside the cross, and a blue border containing six inescutcheons featuring a red chevron on white, representing the six states. These arms were used by the government and appeared on the sixpence coin from 1910 until 1963, and the threepence, shilling and florin from 1910 to 1936.

These arms were controversial even before they were granted. The Scottish Patriotic Association was vocally opposed to the shield's design, noting that the inclusion of the Cross of Saint George should also require the inclusion of the Scottish and Irish crosses to represent the other settlers from the British Isles. They also objected to the lack of consultation with the heralds of Scotland and Ireland. Supported by the Victorian Scottish Union and the St Andrew Society, there were calls for the arms to be completely redesigned to either include symbols of all the British nationalities or instead use only Australian symbology.

William Gullick, designer of the New South Wales coat of arms, subsequently brought to public attention the existence of the Bowman Flag of 1805, which he suggested was the origin of the unofficial colonial arms. It depicted a rose, shamrock and thistle supported by a kangaroo and emu. He was then commissioned by the prime minister to redesign the arms.

=== 1912 Arms ===
Bowman Flag 1806 depicts the emu and kangaroo as supporters.

The 1908 arms were redesigned in 1911, and officially granted by George V on 19 September 1912. The redesign spurred much debate in Parliament. The member of Parliament for Wentworth, Willie Kelly, said:

The emu and kangaroo are so built that they hardly fit into the heraldic atmosphere, and I think we make ourselves ridiculous when we endeavour to carry on the traditions of the Old World with some of the wild creations of our Australian fauna.

Despite objections, the kangaroo and emu now not having its leg up remained the shield bearers in the new coat of arms and were modified to appear more realistic. To address concerns that Australia's states were not individually represented, each state's heraldic badge was depicted on the shield. Scottish criticism of the old arms was alleviated with the addition of the ermine border, a feature of Scottish heraldry. The new coat of arms removed the bed of grass beneath the shield and changed the scroll to read simply "Australia". The colours in the wreath were also changed from blue and white to blue and gold. A background of two sprays of golden wattle was added, but it has never been an official part of the armorial bearings, although later golden wattle was proclaimed Australia's national flower on 19 August 1988.

The use of each state's badge had been a feature of the first Great Seal of Australia, introduced on 21 January 1904, where they surrounded the UK Royal Arms; according to Charles R. Wylie, badges were used because South Australia and Western Australia did not yet have coats of arms.

=== Proposed 1954 redesign ===
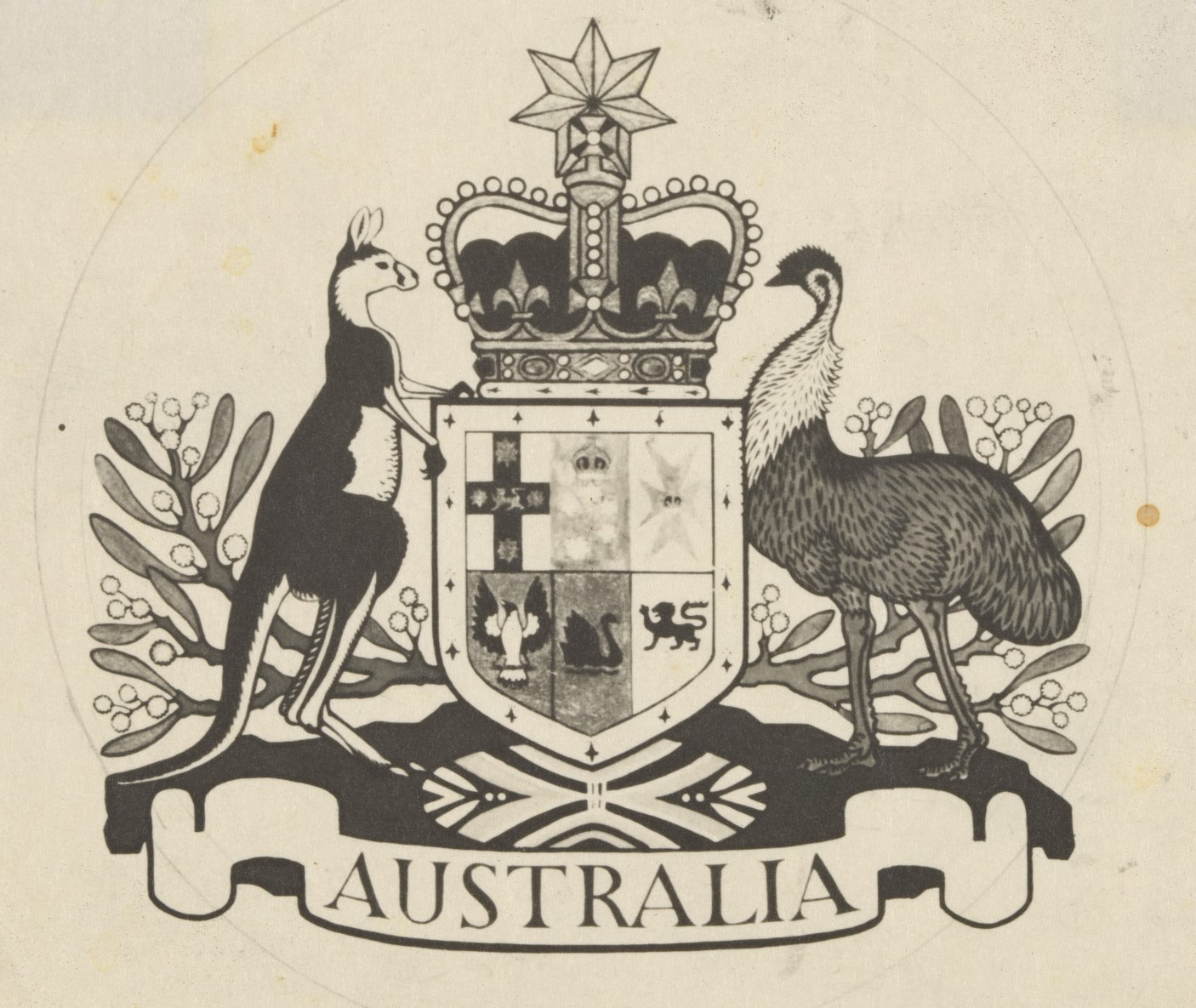
Eileen Mayo's proposed coat of arms (1955)

Darryl Lindsay in 1954 suggested that the arms were "artistically bad", prompting the Menzies government to engage several artists (including Alistair Morrison, Alfred Cook, Cedric Emanuel and Eileen Mayo) to consider a redesign of the arms. While not wishing to change the major elements, the government "was anxious" to add a crown and remove the golden wattle (for ease of reproduction). Bill Taylor MP also suggested that the arms be reissued as a version of the royal arms, like the Canadian royal arms of 1921, to accord with Australia's greater independence following the Statute of Westminster 1931. In 1955 a committee recommended a design by Mayo be adopted, which included a crown and an Aboriginal shield, but ultimately no changes were made.

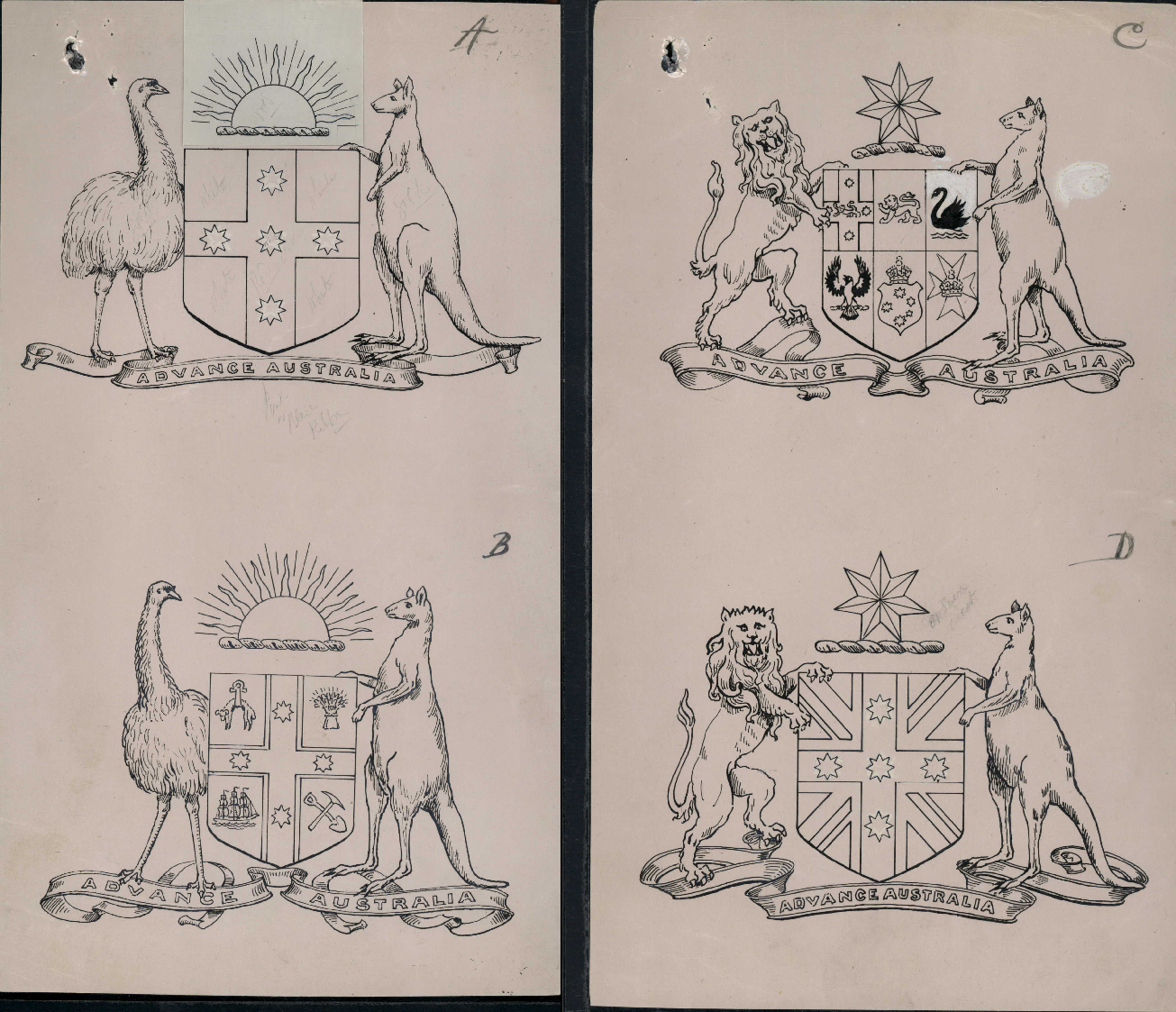
Four proposed designs for the Australian arms by William Gullick. A modified version of the top right version was ultimately selected.

== Use ==
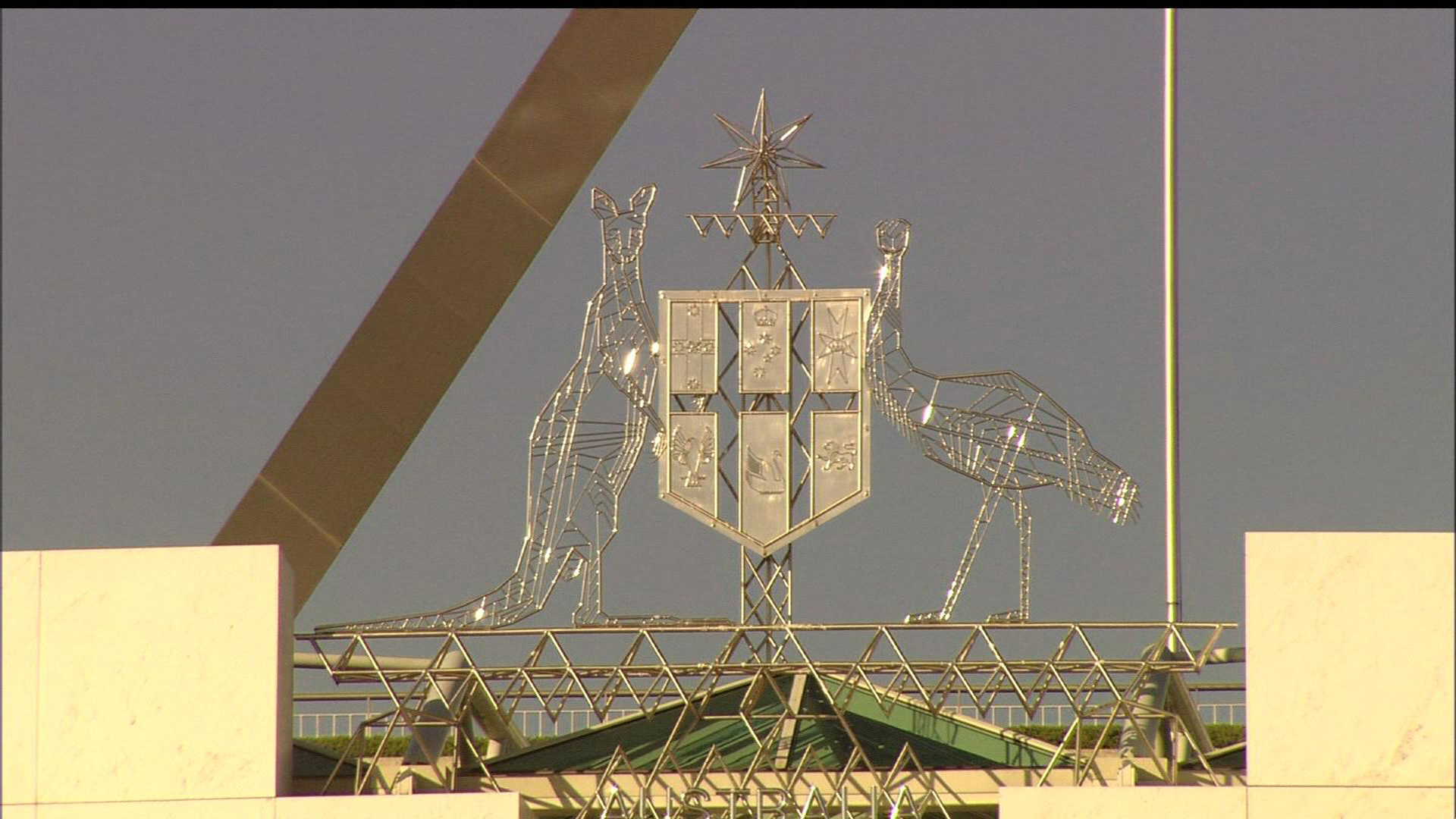
The arms depicted in metal on Parliament House, Canberra

The Commonwealth Coat of Arms is the formal symbol of the Commonwealth of Australia that signifies Commonwealth authority and ownership. The Arms are used by Australian Government departments and agencies, statutory and non-statutory authorities, the Parliament and Commonwealth courts and tribunals. Senators and Federal Members of the Australian Parliament may also use the Arms in the course of their duties as Parliamentarians. The coat of arms should never be used where it could wrongly imply a formal guarantee, sponsorship or endorsement by the Commonwealth. Use of the arms by private citizens or organisations is rarely permitted; however, there are provisions for use by sporting bodies and in educational publications. For instance, the arms appear on the uniforms of the Australian Olympic Team and the Matildas. Use of the coat of arms without permission may breach the Competition and Consumer Act 2010, section 145.1 of the Criminal Code Act 1995 or section 39(2) of the Trade Marks Act 1995. The import of goods bearing the arms is also illegal according to the Customs (Prohibited Imports) Regulations.

There is a full colour version and nine heraldically correct official versions exist for single-colour reproduction.

The coat of arms is the basis of Charles III's Personal Australian Flag, and since 1973 a slightly modified version has formed the basis of the Great Seal of Australia.

The coat of arms has appeared on Australian coinage since the coins for the Australian pound were minted in the early 20th century. Until 1936, the 1908 coat of arms featured on the reverse of all silver coins in regular circulation(3d, 6d, 1'/, 2'/). After 1936, the current coat of arms was featured on the reverse of the Florin (2'/), while the 1908 arms remained on the sixpence (6d). Since decimalisation in 1966, the current coat of arms has featured on the reverse of both variants of the 50-cent coin.

The coat of arms is used as badge of rank for Warrant Officers Class 1 (Army) and Warrant Officer (Navy and Air Force). A more stylised version is used as a badge of rank for Warrant Officer of the Navy, Regimental Sergeant Major of the Army and Warrant Officer of the Air Force.

Australians are sometimes erroneously claimed to be the only people who eat the animals on their coat of arms, and the combination of both kangaroo and emu meat in a single dish such as pie or pizza is known as the Coat of Arms.

== Arms depicted on coins ==
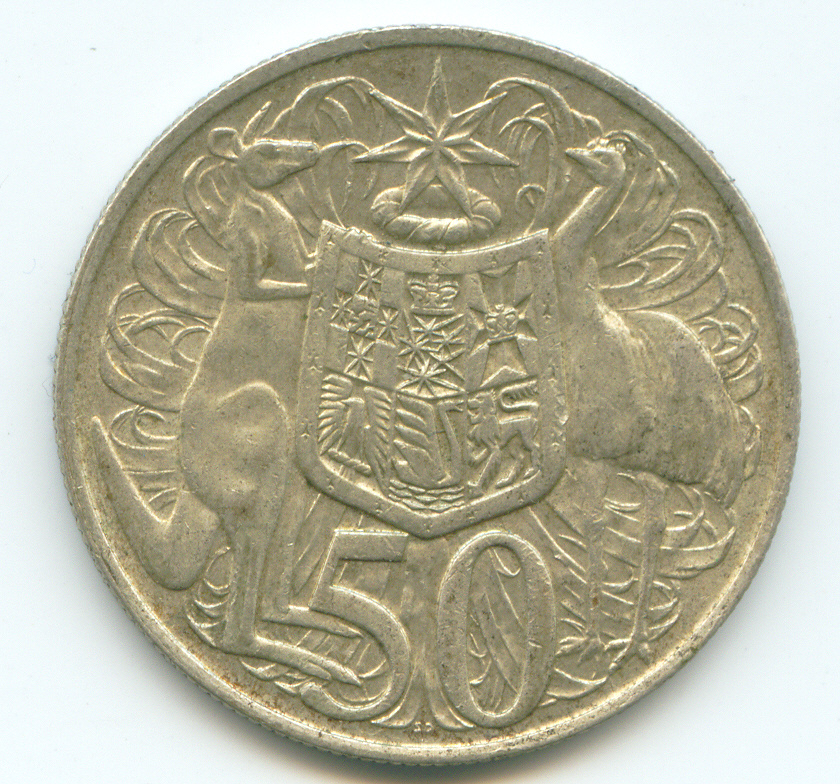
1966 round 50 cent coin

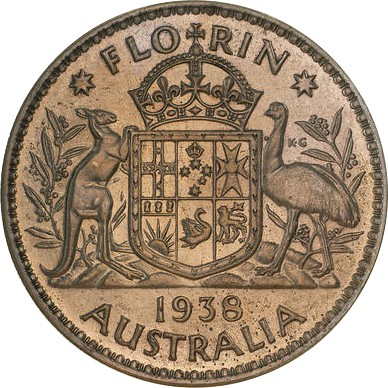
Post-1936 Australian Florin (2s or 2/-)

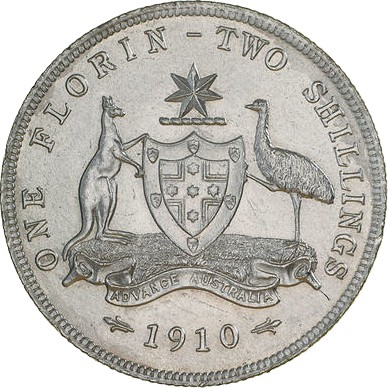
Pre-1936 Australian Florin (2s or 2/-)

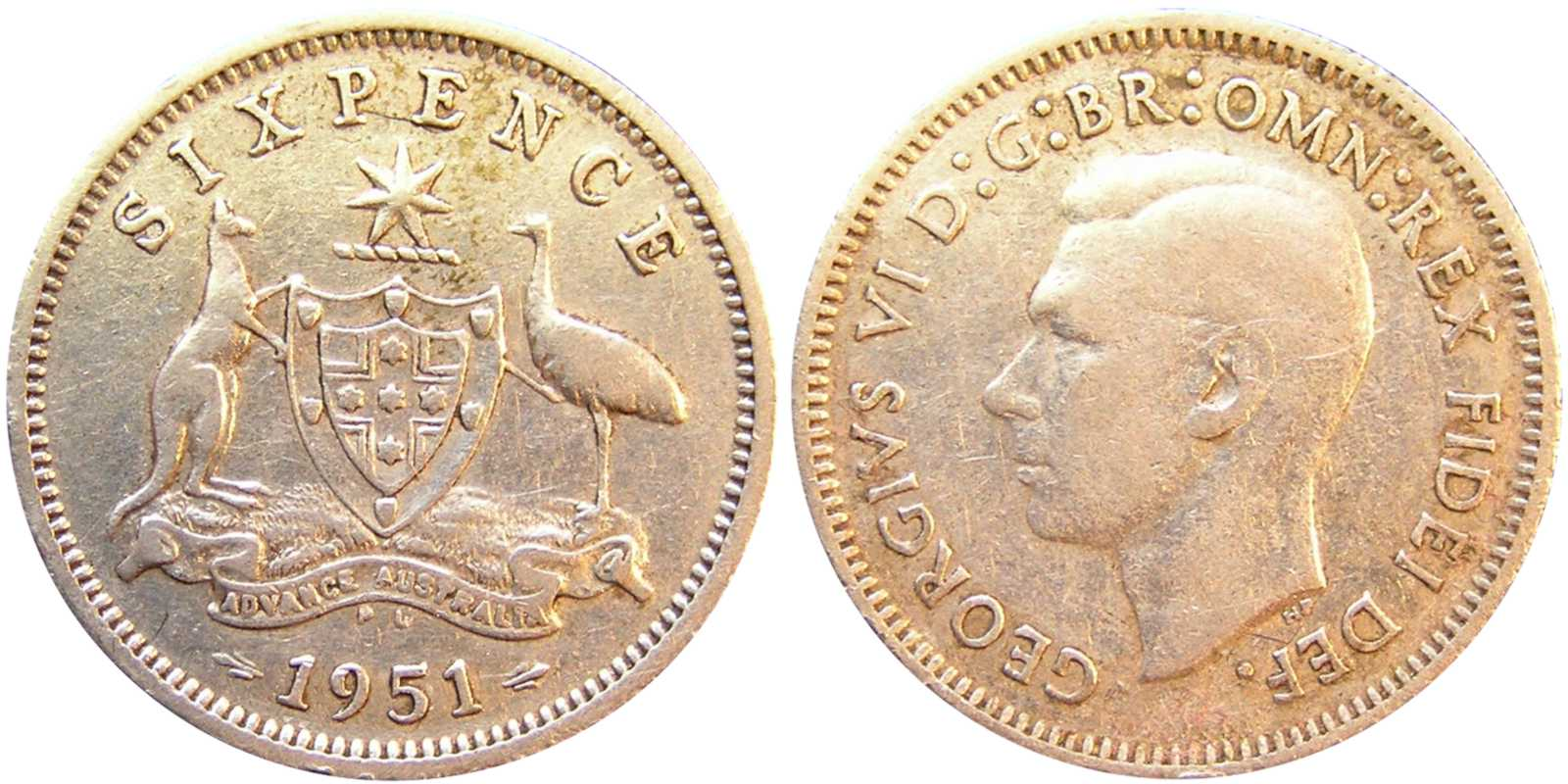
Australian sixpence (6d)

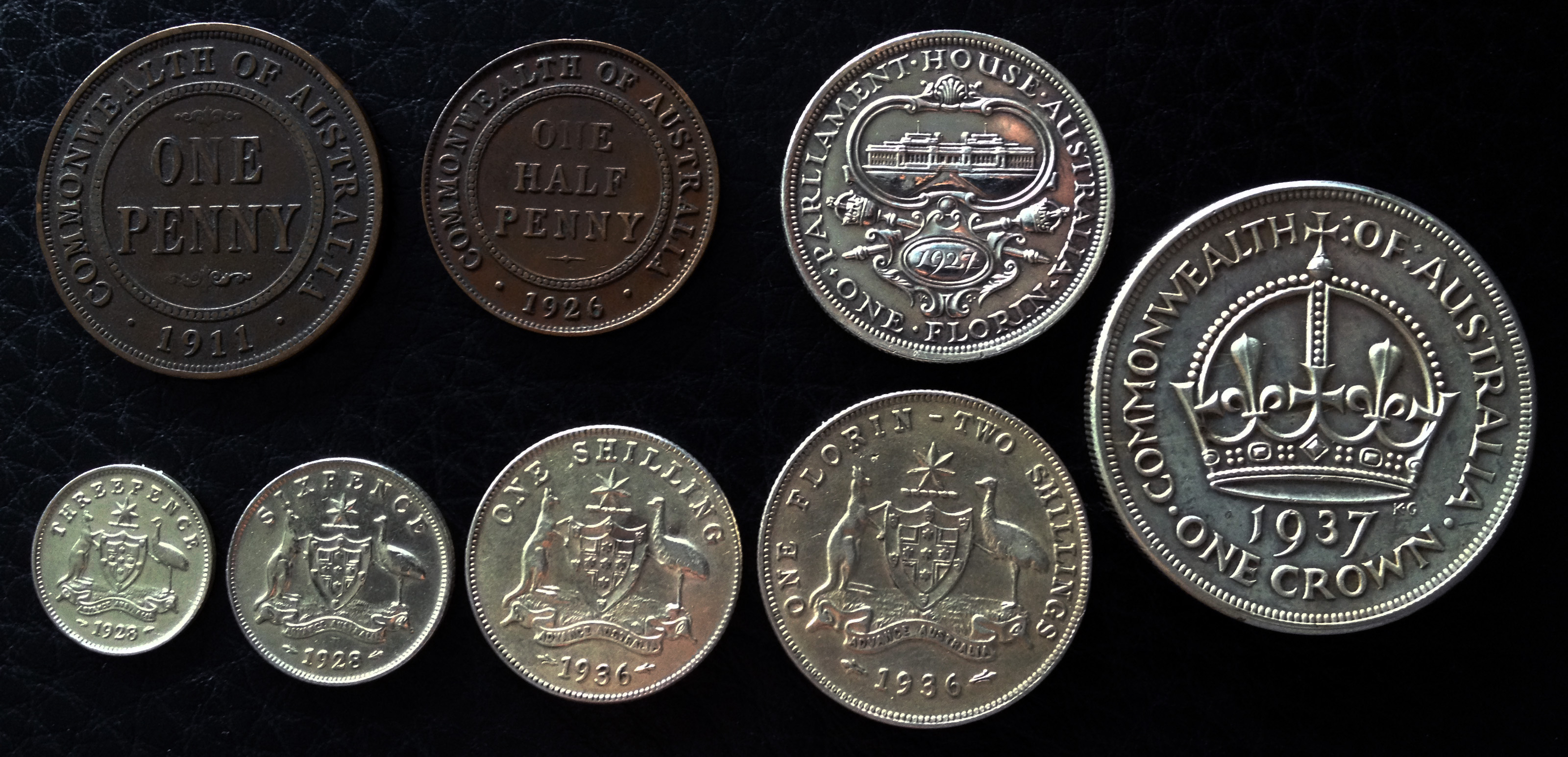
Pre-1936 coins of the Australian pound

== See also ==
- Flag of Australia
- National colours of Australia
- Australian heraldry
