= Outline of New South Wales =

Overview and topical guide of New South Wales

The following is an outline and topical guide to New South Wales:

The Flag of New South Wales

The Coat of arms of New South Wales

The location of New South Wales in relation to the rest of Australia

New South Wales (commonly abbreviated as NSW) is a state on the east coast of Australia. It borders Queensland to the north, Victoria to the south, and South Australia to the west. Its coast borders the Coral and Tasman Seas to the east. The Australian Capital Territory and Jervis Bay Territory are enclaves within the state. New South Wales' state capital is Sydney, which is also Australia's most populous city. In December 2023, the population of New South Wales was over 8.3 million, making it Australia's most populous state. Almost two-thirds of the state's population, 5.3 million, live in the Greater Sydney area.

== General reference ==
- Names
  - Common name: New South Wales
  - Abbreviations and name codes
    - Postal abbreviation: NSW
    - ISO 3166-2 code: AU-NSW
  - Nicknames:
    - The First State
    - The Premier State
- Demonym: New South Welshmen

== Geography of New South Wales ==
Köppen climate types in New South Wales

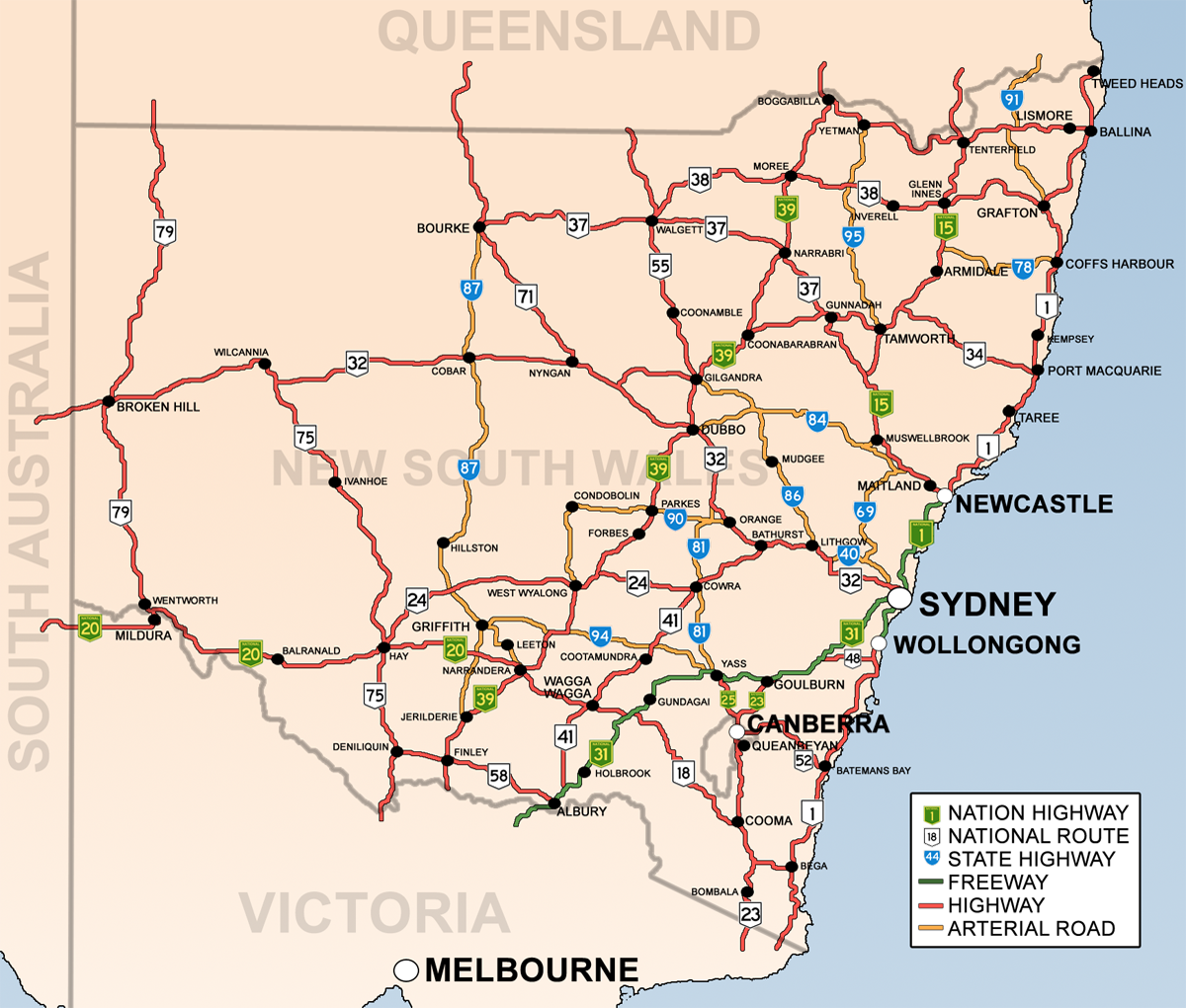
Map of New South Wales showing highways connecting towns and major centres

- Population:
  - 8,414,000
- Area:
  - 801,150 km^{2}
  - 309,330 sq mi
- Location:
  - Southern and Eastern Hemisphere
    - Oceania
      - Australasia
        - Australia
          - Australia
            - Mainland Australia
              - Eastern Australia

=== Regions and subregions ===
- New South Wales North Coast
  - Mid North Coast
  - Northern Rivers
- Central Coast
  - Hunter
- South Coast
- Northern Tablelands
- Central Tablelands
- Southern Tablelands
- Snowy Mountains
- North West Slopes
- South Western Slopes
- Far West
- Orana
- Sydney Metropolitan

=== Natural disasters ===
- Floods in New South Wales

== Government and politics of New South Wales ==
=== Electoral districts ===
- Albury
- Auburn
- Badgerys Creek
- Ballina
- Balmain
- Bankstown
- Barwon
- Bathurst
- Bega
- Blacktown
- Blue Mountains
- Cabramatta
- Camden
- Campbelltown
- Canterbury
- Castle Hill
- Cessnock
- Charlestown
- Clarence
- Coffs Harbour
- Coogee
- Cootamundra
- Cronulla
- Davidson
- East Hills
- Epping
- Fairfield
- Gosford
- Goulburn
- Granville
- Hawkesbury
- Heathcote
- Heffron
- Holsworthy
- Hornsby
- Keira
- Kellyville
- Kiama
- Kogarah
- Lake Macquarie
- Lane Cove
- Leppington
- Lismore
- Liverpool
- Londonderry
- Macquarie Fields
- Maitland
- Manly
- Maroubra
- Miranda
- Monaro
- Mount Druitt
- Murray
- Myall Lakes
- Newcastle
- Newtown
- North Shore
- Northern Tablelands
- Oatley
- Orange
- Oxley
- Parramatta
- Penrith
- Pittwater
- Port Macquarie
- Port Stephens
- Prospect
- Riverstone
- Rockdale
- Ryde
- Shellharbour
- South Coast
- Strathfield
- Summer Hill
- Swansea
- Sydney
- Tamworth
- Terrigal
- The Entrance
- Tweed
- Upper Hunter
- Vaucluse
- Wagga Wagga
- Wahroonga
- Wakehurst
- Wallsend
- Willoughby
- Winston Hills
- Wollondilly
- Wollongong
- Wyong

== History of New South Wales ==
=== Cities ===
- History of Newcastle
- History of Sydney

== Culture of New South Wales ==
=== Sports in New South Wales ===
- Australian rules football in New South Wales
- Women's sport in New South Wales

=== Symbols of New South Wales ===
Collage of different symbols of New South Wales

- Black opal
- Blue groper
- Coat of arms of New South Wales
- Flag of New South Wales
- Kookaburra
- Mandageria fairfaxi
- Platypus
- Sky blue
- Waratah

== See also ==
- Outline of Australia
