= List of flags of the Cocos (Keeling) Islands =

The Following is a List of Flags used in Cocos (Keeling) Islands in Australia

== Territorial flag ==
Flag	Date	Use	Description
	2004–present	Flag of the Cocos (Keeling) Islands	The flag is green, with a palm tree on a gold disc in the canton, a gold crescent for the Cocos Malay people in the centre of the flag and a gold southern cross in the fly. The flag was designed in 2003 becoming official in 2004.

== Historical flags ==
Flag	Date	Use	Description
	1878-1886; 1942-1946	Flag of British Ceylon	A defaced Blue Ensign with the Arms of the Ceylon Government.
	1886-1900	Flag of The United Kingdom	A superimposition of the flags of England and Scotland with the Saint Patrick's Saltire (representing Ireland).
	1900-1925	Flag of The Straits Settlements	A defaced Blue Ensign with the arms of the Strait Settlements.
	1925-1942	Flag of The Straits Settlements	A defaced Blue Ensign with the arms of the Strait Settlements (without the white disc).
	1946-1952	Flag of The Colony of Singapore	A defaced Blue Ensign with the arms of Singapore.
	1952-1955	Flag of The Colony of Singapore	A defaced Blue Ensign with the arms of Singapore (slightly modified crown).
	1955-2004 (Still used Today)	Flag of Australia	A Blue Ensign defaced with the seven-point Commonwealth Star in the lower hoist quarter and the five stars of the Southern Cross in the fly half.

== See also ==
- List of Australian flags
