= List of flags of Norfolk Island =

The Following is a List of Flags used in Norfolk Island in Australia.

== State Flag ==
| Flag | Date | Use | Description |
|---|---|---|---|
| | 1980–present | Flag of Norfolk Island | A green field with a white square containing a green Norfolk Island pine. |

== Historical Flags ==
| Flag | Date | Use | Description |
|---|---|---|---|
| | 1788-1801 | Flag of The Kingdom of Great Britain | A superimposition of the flags of England and Scotland. |
| | 1801-1914 | Flag of The United Kingdom | A superimposition of the flags of England and Scotland with the Saint Patrick's Saltire (representing Ireland). |
| | 1914-1980 (still used today) | Flag of Australia | A Blue Ensign defaced with the seven-point Commonwealth Star in the lower hoist quarter and the five stars of the Southern Cross in the fly half. |

== See also ==
- List of Australian flags
