= Australian VIP transport =

Government official transport

The Government of Australia has maintained a variety of vehicles for use by the prime minister, other ministers and the governor-general for transport to official and ceremonial events in both the states and territories and overseas. They are also used by the monarch and other members of the royal family when visiting Australia.

== Aircraft ==
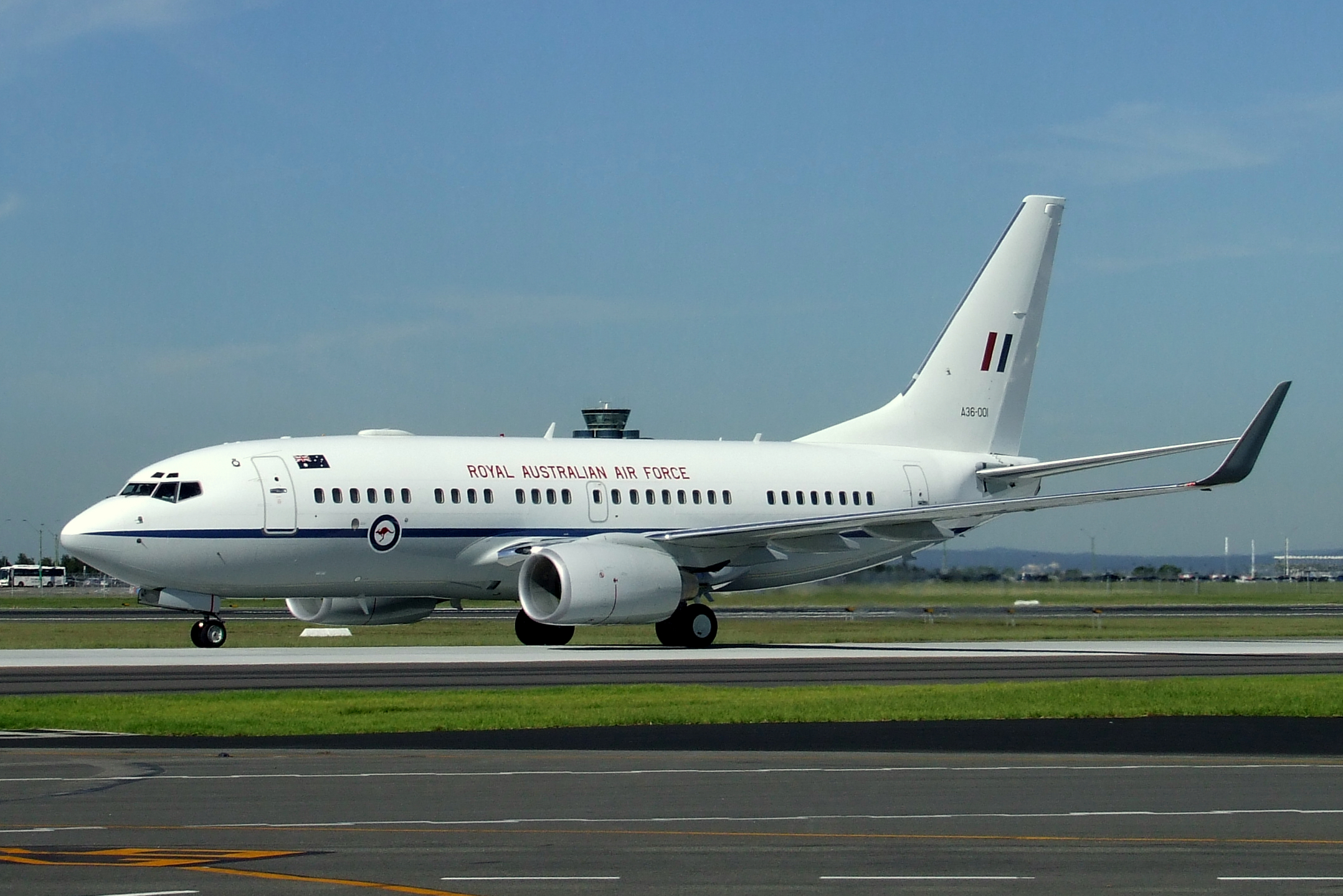
An RAAF Boeing 737 BBJ at Sydney Airport

No. 34 Squadron of the Royal Australian Air Force operates the current VIP fleet of two 737 Boeing Business Jets and three Challenger 604s for use by members of the government; in particular the governor-general, prime minister and other ministers. The aircraft are regularly used for both domestic and international travel.

The two 737 BBJs were acquired on a 13-year lease in 2002 and are fitted with facilities such as conference tables, offices suites, and secure satellite and communication capabilities. The two planes also have a longer range than is standard for 737 BBJs. Both the BBJs and Challengers are based at Defence Establishment Fairbairn in Canberra and are maintained by Qantas Defence Services.

== Cars ==
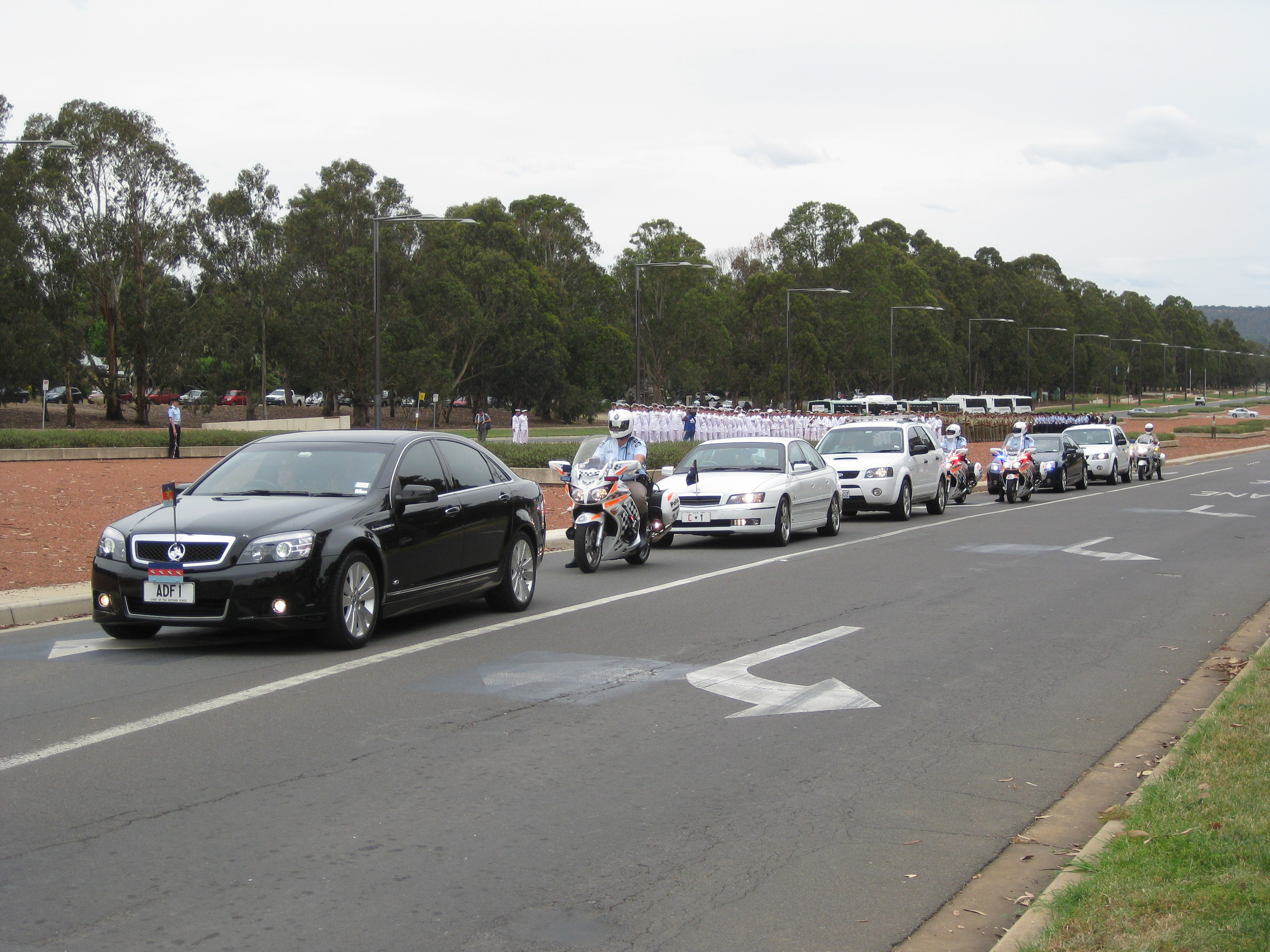
A motorcade transporting senior members of the official party to an event in Canberra in November 2009. The black car, at left, with the numberplate ADF1, carried the chief of the Defence Force; the white car behind it, with the numberplate C1, carried the prime minister; and the black car, second from the right, carried the governor-general.

=== Governor-general ===
The governor-general of Australia travels in a Rolls-Royce Phantom VI limousine for ceremonial occasions, such as the State Opening of Parliament. They more regularly use Australian-built luxury cars, such as a Holden Caprice, when on official business. The official cars of the governor-general fly the flag of the governor-general of Australia and display a representation of St. Edward's Crown instead of number plates. A similar arrangement is used for the governors of the six states.

=== Prime minister ===
The official state car of the prime minister of Australia is a white armoured BMW 7 Series, supported at all times by an armoured BMW X5. Prior to 2013, vehicles in the prime ministerial fleet were white Ford Territory and Holden Caprice models. The prime ministerial vehicle is also escorted by police vehicles from state and federal authorities. The prime minister's car bears the number plate C1 (meaning "Commonwealth 1") and a centrally mounted Australian flag. The prime ministerial car fleet operates as part of COMCAR, a division of the Australian Government's Department of Finance.

In 2013, BMW was selected to provide a fleet of 7 Series High Security vehicles as part of a tender to replace the ageing armoured Holden Caprice fleet that formerly transported the Australian prime minister. The off-the-shelf replacements offer greater protection and better value for money. A BAE and GM-Holden Consortium also bid for the contract.

== Rail transport ==
The various government railway operators of Australia have operated a number of royal trains for members of the royal family on their numerous tours of the country.

During Prince Charles and Princess Diana's visit to the Big Pineapple in 1983, a royal carriage was unofficially assigned to transport the visiting couple around the plantation.

== Other ==
The Australian State Coach is a coach that was a gift from the Australian people to Elizabeth II.

In 1952, Gothic was sent to Cammell Laird shipyards to be refitted to become the royal yacht for a tour of Australia and New Zealand. Although the tour was cancelled due to the death of King George VI, considerable work had already been completed and she returned in 1953 to complete the refit, which included a white-painted hull. In 1954 the Queen's visit to Australia occurred and Gothic was used for the visit. The Australian Government film The Queen in Australia 1954 featured the ship in Sydney on arrival and Fremantle on departure three months later. This visit was part of Queen Elizabeth II's coronation world tour in 1954.

== See also ==
- Royal and viceroyal transport in Canada
- Air transport of the British royal family and government
- List of royal yachts of the United Kingdom
- VIP affair
