= List of flags of Christmas Island =

The following flags have been used in Christmas Island, which is now a territory of Australia.

An unofficial blue and white design from a former phosphate mining company was sometimes used as a coat of arms.

== State Flag ==
| Flag | Date | Use | Description |
|---|---|---|---|
| | 2002–present | Flag of Christmas Island | The blue and green diagonal panels represent the sea and the island's vegetation, a small map of the island is included in the centre. The main emblem is a golden bosun bird. The flag was selected from a competition held in 1986 and was approved in 2002. |

== Historical Flags ==
| Flag | Date | Use | Description |
|---|---|---|---|
| | 1888-1900; 1957-1958 | Flag of The United Kingdom | A superimposition of the flags of England and Scotland with the Saint Patrick's Saltire (representing Ireland). |
| | 1900-1925 | Flag of The Straits Settlements | A defaced Blue Ensign with the arms of the Strait Settlements. |
| | 1925-1942; 1945-1946 | Flag of The Straits Settlements | A defaced Blue Ensign with the arms of the Strait Settlements (without the white disc). |
| | 1942-1945 | Flag of The Empire of Japan | A red disc centered on a white rectangular field. |
| | 1946-1952 | Flag of The Colony of Singapore | A defaced blue ensign with the arms of Singapore. |
| | 1952-1957 | Flag of The Colony of Singapore | A defaced blue ensign with the arms of Singapore (slightly modified crown). |
| | 1958-1986 (Still Used Today) | Flag of Australia | A Blue Ensign defaced with the seven-point Commonwealth Star in the lower hoist quarter and the five stars of the Southern Cross in the fly half. |

== See also ==
- List of Australian flags
