= Flag of Queensland =

Australian state flag

Queensland
- Use: Civil and state flag
- Proportion: 1:2
- Adopted: 1876; 150 years ago
- Design: A British Blue Ensign defaced with the state badge on a white disc in the fly

Badge of Queensland

The state flag of Queensland is a British Blue Ensign with the state badge on a white disc added in the fly. The badge is a light blue Maltese cross with a Saint Edward's Crown in the centre of the cross. The flag dates from 1876, with minor variations, and the badge was designed by William Hemmant, the Colonial Secretary and Treasurer of Queensland in 1876.

== History ==
=== 1859 Separation Flag ===
On 10 December 1859 (also known as "Proclamation Day" in Queensland), over 180 days after Queensland's formal separation from the Colony of New South Wales, the Separation Flag was flown at 08:00 in Brisbane under a twenty-one gun salute, marking the proclamation of Queensland's separation from New South Wales. The flag was described as being sky blue with the St George's Cross and union in the corner. The flag was also known as the "Moreton Bay Flag".

Queensland Separation Flag (1859)

Queensland Separation Flag (St George's Cross with white border) (1859)

Queensland Separation Flag (St George's Cross with white border; different shade of blue) (1859)

=== 1870 proposed flag ===
In 1865, the British admiralty stated that colonial vessels should fly the British Blue Ensign defaced with the state badge. As Queensland did not have a badge at this time, one depicting Queen Victoria on a blue disc surrounded by the name "Queensland" was suggested. However, this proved to be too difficult to reproduce, leading to new design being considered.

Proposed badge of Queensland (1870)

Proposed flag of Queensland (1870)

=== 1876–1963 ===
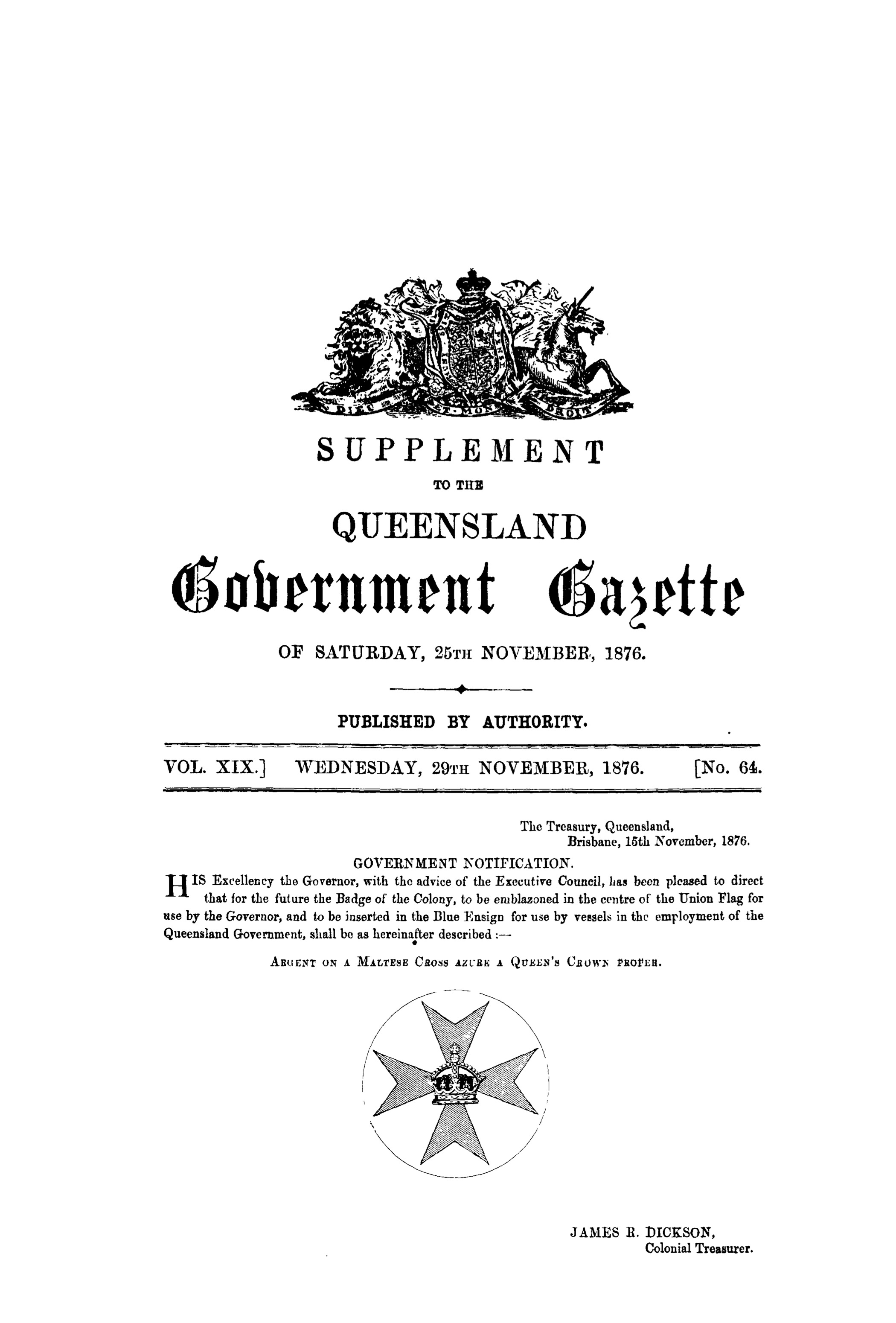
Gazette announcing the adoption of the current badge

As the previous design was found to be unworkable, a new design was submitted to the Admiralty for approval:

Referring to the Circular Despatch of the Secretary of State for the Colonies, dated 23 August last, upon the subject of distinctive badges proposed for the Flags of several Colonies, I have the honour to advise Your Excellency that the difficulty of producing upon bunting a fair representation of the head or bust of Her Majesty has proved so great, and the effect, when produced, so unsatisfactory, as to render it necessary to abandon the idea of using that device for the Queensland Ensign, and I beg therefore to recommend that the accompanying design, within a wreath of laurel, be adopted for the Flags of the Colony in lieu of that formerly advised.

The Maltese Cross impaled with the Crown was chosen out of four proposed designs to replace Victoria's head.

Flag of Queensland (1876–1963)

Badge of Queensland (1876–1963)

First example of a proposed badge for the flag of Queensland

Second example of a proposed badge for the flag of Queensland

Third example of a proposed badge for the flag of Queensland

=== 1963 to present ===
Following Queen Elizabeth II decision to use the Crown of St Edward as her royal cypher, in 1963 the State Emblem and the State flag was once again updated with the design of the crown following the preference of the monarch.

King Charles III decided to use the Tudor Crown on his royal cypher following his accession to the throne in 2022. However, the Labor Queensland government stated on 4 May 2023 that they do not plan to update the crown on the state emblem or flag. This position was maintained by the newly elected Liberal-National government on 31 January 2026.

Flag of Queensland (1963 to present)

== Government distribution ==
The Queensland Government offers free state flags to eligible organisations including:

- Schools
- Recognised youth organisations
- Community service groups
- Charities
- Sporting clubs
- Local government authorities.

== See also ==
- Coat of arms of Queensland
- List of Australian flags
- Flags of the governors of the Australian states
