= List of Australian flags =

This is a list of flags of different designs that have been used in Australia. The position of the flag on the official order of precedence is indicated, with other national flags having a precedence of "2". When multiple flags are flown together in a line, flags should be flown in order of precedence from left to right.

Flags under copyright are not displayed here, instead having placeholder links to the flags.

== National flag ==
Flag	Date	Use	Description	Precedence
	1908–present	Australian national flag, naval jack and state ensign	A Blue Ensign defaced with the Commonwealth Star in the lower hoist quarter and the five stars of the Southern Cross in the fly half. The Centenary Flag, the nation's flag of state used on ceremonial occasions, additionally includes a white headband with a red stripe.	1

== State and territory flags ==
Flag	Date	Use	Description	Precedence
	1876–present	Flag of New South Wales	A St George's Cross with four gold stars and a lion in the fly of a British Blue Ensign.	3-1
	1877–present	Flag of Victoria	The Southern Cross surmounted by a crown in the fly of a British Blue Ensign.	3-2
	1876–present (Note: The rendition of the crown has changed according to the monarchs' wishes. In 1963 the existing Tudor Crown was replaced with the St Edward's Crown.)	Flag of Queensland	A light blue Maltese cross with a crown on a white background in the fly of a British Blue Ensign.	3-3
	1904–present	Flag of South Australia	A piping shrike on a gold background in the fly of a British Blue Ensign.	3-4
	1953–present	Flag of Western Australia	A black swan on a gold background in the fly of a British Blue Ensign.	3-5
	1876–present	Flag of Tasmania	A red lion on a white background in the fly of a British Blue Ensign.	3-6
	1993–present	Flag of the Australian Capital Territory	Vertical bicolour; one third blue with the Southern Cross, the other two thirds are yellow with the coat of arms of Canberra.	3-7
	1978–present	Flag of the Northern Territory	Vertical bicolour; one third black with the Southern Cross, the other two thirds are ochre with Sturt's desert rose, the floral emblem of the Territory.	3-8
	1980–present	Flag of Norfolk Island	A vertical triband of green, white, and green, with a green Norfolk Island pine in the white band.	3-? (Note: The Norfolk Island flag is not listed in the order of precedence for state and territory flags.)

=== Unofficial territory flags ===
Flag	Date	Use	Description
	1986–present	Flag of Christmas Island	The blue and green diagonal panels represent the sea and the island's vegetation; a small map of the island is included in the centre. The main emblem is a golden bosun bird. The flag was selected from a competition held in 1986.
Link to flag	2004–present	Flag of the Cocos (Keeling) Islands	A green field with symbols such as a palm tree on a gold disc, which represents the islands' tropical flora; a crescent, which represent the Muslim Cocos Malays; and the Southern Cross, which represent Australia and the Southern Hemisphere. The flag mostly uses the national colours of Australia.

== Nationally proclaimed flags of Indigenous peoples ==
Flag	Date	Use	Description	Precedence
	1971–present	Australian Aboriginal flag	A black and red flag with a yellow circle in the middle. The flag was designed in 1971 by Harold Thomas.	4
Link to flag	1992–present	Torres Strait Islander flag	A five-pointed star and traditional headdress in white, on a blue, green and black background. It was designed in 1992 by Bernard Namok.	4

== Proclaimed Australian Defence Force flags ==
Flag	Date	Use	Description	Precedence
	2000–present	Australian Defence Force Ensign	A tricolour of dark blue (navy); red (army) and light blue (airforce) with the triservice badge.	4-1
	1967–present	Australian White Ensign	A version of the national flag with a white field defaced with a blue Commonwealth Star in the lower canton quarter and a blue Southern Cross in the fly.	4-2
	1982–present	Royal Australian Air Force Ensign	The national flag with an Air Force blue field, the Southern Cross tilted and the RAAF roundel (Kangaroo) placed in the lower fly.	4-3

== Other official federal flags prescribed under the Flags Act 1953 ==
Flag	Date	Use	Description	Precedence
	1908–present	Australian Red Ensign	A Red Ensign defaced with the Commonwealth Star in the lower hoist quarter and the five stars of the Southern Cross in the fly half.	4

== Royal and viceregal flags ==
=== Sovereign ===
Flag	Date	Use	Description	Precedence
	1962–2022	Personal Australian Flag of Queen Elizabeth II	Consists of a banner of the coat of arms of Australia, defaced with a gold seven-pointed federation star with a blue disc containing the letter E below a crown, surrounded by a garland of golden roses.	Where practical, it should be flown alone when flown on or outside a building occupied by the monarch. Also flown on vehicles carrying the monarch.
	2024–present	King's Flag for Australia	Consists of a banner of the coat of arms of Australia.	Where practical, it should be flown alone when flown on or outside a building occupied by the monarch. Also flown on vehicles carrying the monarch.

=== Governor-General ===
Flag	Date	Use	Description	Precedence
	1909–1936	Flag of the Governor-General of Australia	A Union Flag defaced with a seven pointed star, crowned, surrounded by ears of corn and a gold circlet. The crown used is the Tudor Crown.	Flown continuously when the governor-general is in residence and on vehicles carrying the governor-general.
	1936–present (Note: The crown has been modified according to the monarch's wishes. From 1936–1963 and from 2024 to present, a tudor crown has been used. From 1963–2024 a St Edward's crown was used.)	Flag of the Governor-General of Australia	A crowned lion standing on a crown on a blue field. The crown used is the Tudor Crown.	Flown continuously when the governor-general is in residence and on vehicles carrying the governor-general.

=== State governors ===
Flag	Date	Use	Description	Precedence
	1981–present	Standard of the governor of New South Wales	The state flag with a crowned badge.	Flown continuously when the governor is in residence, at events the governor attends and on vehicles carrying the governor.
	1984–present	Standard of the governor of Victoria	The state flag with a yellow field and crowned southern cross.	Flown continuously when the governor is in residence, at events the governor attends and on vehicles carrying the governor.
	1876–present	Standard of the governor of Queensland	The Union Flag defaced with the state badge.	Flown continuously when the governor is in residence, at events the governor attends and on vehicles carrying the governor.
	1975–present (Note: The rendition of the crown has changed according to the monarchs' wishes. In 2024 the existing St Edward's Crown was replaced with the Tudor Crown.)	Standard of the governor of South Australia	The state flag with a crowned badge. St Edward's Crown was replaced with the Tudor Crown in 2024.	Flown continuously when the governor is in residence, at events the governor attends and on vehicles carrying the governor.
	1988–present	Standard of the governor of Western Australia	The state flag with a crowned badge. St Edward's Crown was replaced with the Tudor Crown in 2025.	Flown continuously when the governor is in residence, at events the governor attends and on vehicles carrying the governor.
	1977–present	Standard of the governor of Tasmania	The state flag with a crowned badge.	Flown continuously when the governor is in residence, at events the governor attends and on vehicles carrying the governor.

== Local flags ==
Flag	Date	Use	Description
	1982–present	Armorial flag of the City of Adelaide	Blue background divided into four quarters by a Saint George's Cross outlined in gold overlain with the Arms of the City of Adelaide. Flag bordered on three sides by diagonal blue and gold stripes.
Link to flag		Flag of the local government area of Aṉangu Pitjantjatjara Yankunytjatjara	The logo of Anangu Pitjantjatjara Yankunytjatjara on a red field.
	1947–present	Flag of the City of Brisbane	Blue background (representing the Brisbane River) bordered by a golden checker pattern (representing the Sun and Brisbane's warm climate) with the flag divided into six quarters. The upper hoist quarter contains a golden caducei superimposed on wavy white lines, representing the Brisbane River and its ties to the city's commerce. The lower hoist quarter contains two Stafford knots and a white star arranged vertically (all represent the achievements in astronomy of Sir Thomas Brisbane, for whom the city is named). The remaining segments alternate between these two designs. The flag design is based on the shield on the coat of arms of Brisbane.
	2009–present	Flag of the City of Darwin	According to council policy, Darwin maintains both the coat of arms flag and a logo flag.
		Flag of the City of Hobart	The flag of Hobart City Council, of Tasmania, Australia. Designed in 1951 by Hobart architect and alderman, I.G. Anderson and first flown in 1953. The star is derived from the arms of Lord Hobart, 4th Earl of Buckinghamshire (1760–1816), Secretary of State for War and the Colonies at the time of colonial settlement (1804), and after whom Hobart is named. The colour used on the arms Lord Hobart was, in fact, sable (black), rather than blue. The red lion is from the Tasmanian flag – and its location at the top of the shield signifies Hobart's position as the Capital City.
		Flag of the City of Melbourne	White background divided into four quarters by a Saint George's Cross outlined by a concise and overlain with St Edward's Crown. Quadrant features represent the main activities of the economy of the City of Melbourne in the mid-19th century and are, in a clockwise direction from top left, a fleece hanging from a red ring (wool), a black bull standing on a hillock (cattle), a three-mast ship in full sail (shipping), and a spouting whale in the sea (whaling). The flag design is identical to the shield on the coat of arms of Melbourne.
	1949–present	Flag of the City of Perth	Saint George's Cross overlaid with the City of Perth coat of arms in the centre.
	1908–present	Flag of the City of Sydney	The flag is a horizontal triband, with middle and lower bands of gold and blue. The top third features three designs. In the top hoist the arms belong to Thomas Townshend, Viscount Sydney, after whom the city was named. The English Naval Flag in the centre acknowledges the role Arthur Philip played in Sydney's foundation. The red cross is overlaid with a globe and two stars – the principal features of James Cook's Arms, which were granted as a posthumous honour for his service in mapping Australia. The arms in the top fly belong to the first Lord Mayor of Sydney, Thomas Hughes. It was during his term of office that the title of Mayor became Lord Mayor, and the official coat of arms for the city was granted. The remaining field of the flag features a ship under full sail, an allusion to the prominence of Sydney as a maritime port.
	circa 1960–2008	Flag of the City of Toowoomba	The flag of Toowoomba city is a violet coloured ensign which makes reference to the city's floral emblem of the day, the Toowoomba Violet (aka the sweet violet, Lat. 'Viola odorata'). Notable is the city's coat of arms in the centre of the ensign and the city's name along the hoist of the flag, lettered from top to bottom.
Link to flag	2008–present	Flag of Toowoomba	A new Toowoomba flag was created in 2007 and became the official flag of the Toowoomba Region on 15 March 2008 with the amalgamation of eight councils; the councils were Clifton Shire, Crows Nest Shire, Cambooya Shire, Jondaryan Shire, Millmerran Shire, Pittsworth Shire, Rosalie Shire and Toowoomba City. The predominant colours are white and teal. The three white rings in the flag intersect to create eight spaces from their loops and exterior, symbolising the unity of the eight amalgamated former councils. The colour of teal also represents unity.
	1965–present	Flag of Wagga Wagga	The Wagga Wagga City flag is square. The upper quarter of the flag contains eight stalks of wheat positioned so as to form two capital letters W on a green field. The lower quarter of the upper half of the flag contains a wavy blue line on yellow, representing the river winding through the wheat fields. The lower half of the flag contains the head of a ram positioned centrally on a green field.
	1850–present	Upper Murray River Flag	Flown by vessels on the upper reaches of the Murray River, predominantly in Victoria. The blue bars are said to represent the four major rivers that form the Murray-Darling River system and their dark hue represents the darker colour of the Murray River's darker waters in Victoria and NSW.
	1850–present	Lower Murray River Flag	Flown by vessels on the lower reaches of the Murray River, predominantly in South Australia. The blue bars are said to represent the four major rivers that form the Murray-Darling River system and their light hue represents the lighter colour of the Murray River's lighter waters in South Australia.
Link to flag	1996–present	Flag of Dangar Island, New South Wales	The black field divided by a white cross represents the Saint Piran's Cross, honouring the Cornish heritage of Henry Cary Dangar, after whom the island is named. The four red eight-pointed stars invoke the New South Wales version of the Southern Cross. In the canton, the yellow tower symbolises the sandstone tower that has stood on the island since 1886, while the mullet serves as a homage to the fact that the island was previously known as Mullet Island.
	1998–present	Flag of Lord Howe Island, New South Wales	The unofficial flag harks to the pre-1801 Union Jack. It features a blue background, a white cross of St George and the cross of St Andrew, and a yellow circle in the centre with a blue depiction of the island.
	1996–present	Flag of Scotland Island, New South Wales	

== Other official federal flags ==
Flag	Date	Use	Description
	1948–present	Australian civil air ensign	A light blue ensign, divided into quarters by a dark blue cross with a white fimbriation. There is a Union Jack in the upper hoist quarter, the Commonwealth Star in the quarter below, and the five stars of the Southern Cross in the fly half, rotated by roughly 45 degrees with the smallest star completely inside the arm of the blue cross. From 1935 to 1948, the stars were yellow.
	2015–present	Australian Border Force Flag	The Australian national flag defaced with "AUSTRALIAN BORDER FORCE"

== Federal and state police ==
Flag	Date	Use	Description
Link to flag	1982–present	Flag of the Australian Federal Police	A black-white-black vertical triband, with the badge of the Australian Federal Police in the centre of the white stripe. A black-and-white checkerboard borders the flag.
Link to flag	2006–present	Flag of the Queensland Police Service	A light blue and dark blue horizontal bicolor with the badge of the Queensland Police Service in the centre of the flag.
Link to flag	2005–present	Flag of the Western Australia Police	A white flag with a stylised depiction of a swan and chequerboard in blue, with the Western Australia Police emblem added. Replaced previous flag in use from 1970 to 2000.
Link to flag	1989–present	Flag of the Northern Territory Police Force	The Northern Territory flag with its flower symbol replaced by the NT police badge.
Link to flag	1853–present	Flag of the Victoria Police	British blue ensign with the emblem of the Victoria Police.

== Sporting flags ==
Flag	Date	Use	Description
Link to flag	1983–present	Boxing Kangaroo sporting flag	A golden kangaroo wearing red boxing gloves on a green field. A registered trademark of the Australian Olympic Committee.

== Ethnic group flags ==
Flag	Date	Use	Description
Link to flag	2021–present	Flag of Taungurung	A rectangle diagonally divided by a yellow wavy line, representing the rise of the Taungurung. The upper hoist side is ocher with seven stars arranged into the constellation of the Pleiades, the bottom fly side is black.
	1999–present	Flag of Ngarrindjeri	Designed in 1999. A dark blue background with a white horizontal band across the middle. Along the upper and lower blue sections are eighteen white dots, representing the eighteen Laklinyeris, or groups/tribes, of the Ngarrindjeri Nation. In the centre is a yellow sun representing life, partly covered by a red/ochre Sacred Boomerang, connected with calling leaders together for a Tendi, a Ngarrindjeri law-making meeting. On each side of the centre are horizontal Ngarrindjeri fishing spears representing conciliation.
	1998–present	Flag of South Sea Islanders	Designed in 1994 and formally adopted by the Australian South Sea Islanders United Council in 1998.
	1971–present	Flag of Larrakia	A dark central background (sometimes brown), with red bands/panels on the sides. In the centre is a yellow mound or tree trunk with three green leaves growing from it. The central tree/mound symbol is linked to Kulaluk, an important place in the Larrakia land-rights movement.

== Historical flags ==
=== Historical official flags ===
Flag	Date	Use	Description
	1901–1903	Original 1901 Federal Flag Design Competition winner	A Blue Ensign defaced with the six-point Commonwealth Star in the lower hoist quarter and the five stars of the Southern Cross in the fly half (each star had a varying number of points: 9, 8, 7, 6 and 5—with Alpha Crucis being larger than Beta and Gamma and with Delta being smaller than Beta and Gamma). It was first flown in Melbourne on 3 September 1901, that date now recognised as Flag Day.
	1903–1908	Australian flag as approved by King Edward VII	Flag modified so that all stars of southern cross have seven points, except the smallest star with five points.
	1901–1903	Red version of the 1901 Federal Flag Design Competition winner	A Red Ensign defaced with the six-point Commonwealth Star in the lower hoist quarter and the five stars of the Southern Cross in the fly half (each star had a varying number of points: 9, 8, 7, 6 and 5—with Alpha Crucis being larger than Beta and Gamma and with Delta being smaller than Beta and Gamma).
	1903–1909	Red Ensign, first version approved by King Edward VII	Flag modified so that all stars of southern cross have seven points, except the smallest star with five points.
	1877	Flag of Victoria	
	1876–1963	Flag of Queensland	
	1870–1876	Flag of South Australia	
	1876–1904	Flag of South Australia	
	1902–1949	Flag of the Territory of Papua	British blue ensign with a white disk on the fly, filled with the Tudor Crown and the word "PAPUA".
	1914–1949	Flag of the Territory of New Guinea	British blue ensign with a white disk on the fly, filled with the Tudor Crown and the initialism "T.N.G."
	1971–1975	Flag of the Territory of Papua and New Guinea	The upper triangle is red with the soaring Raggiana bird-of-paradise and the lower triangle is black with the Southern Cross of four white five-pointed stars and one smaller star.
	1935–1948	Australian civil air ensign	Based on the British civil air ensign, with the addition of the Southern Cross and Commonwealth Star in yellow.
	1770–1801	Union Flag	The Union Flag of the Kingdom of Great Britain. First raised in Australia by Captain Cook in April 1770 at Botany Bay.
	1801–present	Union Flag	The Union Flag of the United Kingdom and the British Empire. Given priority over what is now known as the Australian National Flag until the passage of the Flags Act 1953.

=== Historic unofficial flags ===
Flag	Date	Use	Description
	1823/24–1831	National Colonial Flag for Australia	A British White Ensign, featuring four white stars on the red cross.
	1831–1903 (de facto Flag of Australia); 1903–1920s (still commonly used)	Australian Federation Flag/New South Wales Ensign	A British White Ensign, featuring the Cross in blue with five white stars often varying between 5–8 points. It was the de facto flag of Australia from 1 January 1901 to 3 September 1901. It was widely used in New South Wales as a local shipping ensign until 1883 when the Admiralty banned its continued use at sea. The Australian government received approval to fly the Blue Ensign in 1903—but the Australian Federation Flag was still commonly unofficially used by members of the populace as late as the 1920s.
	1854	Eureka Flag	The battle flag of the Eureka Stockade featured the five stars of the constellation Crux Australis in white on a white cross and blue field. The flag has become an Australian symbol of protests and democracy, commonly used by trade unions, the Republican movement and far-right groups.
	1806	Bowman flag	A white swallow-tail fly, with a crest featuring the Rose of England, the thistle of Scotland and the shamrock of Ireland supported by an emu and kangaroo. The design was an inspiration for Australia's national coat of arms.
	Post 1910–c. 1945	British Empire flag	An unofficial flag of the British Empire featuring its constituent dominions and India. The Australian coat of arms are featured in the bottom fly. It was flown by civilians as a display of patriotism on special occasions such as Empire Day. The flag was flown at the official unveiling of the Dangarsleigh War Memorial in 1921, and again at the centennial in 2021.
	1849–1853	Australian Anti-Transportation League Flag	British Blue Ensign, with yellow Southern Cross and white border, to which branch names were added

== See also ==
- List of proposed Australian flags
- Flags of the governors of the Australian states
- List of Christmas Island Flags
- List of Cocos (Keeling) Islands Flags
- List of Norfolk Island Flags
- Advance Australia Fair
- Australian flag debate
- Flag of New Zealand
