= Flag of Melbourne =

City of Melbourne
- Proportion: 1:2
- Adopted: 18 March 1970; 56 years ago

The flag of the City of Melbourne is the official flag for the City of Melbourne, Victoria, Australia. Its design was based on the arms component of Melbourne's coat of arms, which in turn, was based on the 1848 common seal.

The flag features a white background divided into four quadrants by the red cross of Saint George, patron saint of England. On both sides of each arm of the cross are narrow red bars known as a cotise. In the centre there is the Royal Crown, signifying the monarchy.

Each of the four quadrants divided by the cross feature a design representing an important sector of Melbourne's economy in the mid 19th century. The designs are:

- A fleece hanging from a red ring, representing the wool industry;
- A black bull standing on a hillock, representing the cattle industry;
- A three masted tall ship in full sail at sea, representing trade and shipping;
- A spouting whale at sea, representing the whaling industry.

The Melbourne flag is flown at various places, including: Melbourne Town Hall; on the Lord Mayor of Melbourne's car; at Enterprize Park, the location where the settlement began; and on the replica of the tall ship Enterprize.

The flag has been criticized for being too 'cluttered' and calls have been made for its redesign.

== See also ==
- Coat of arms of Melbourne
- List of Australian flags
