= Flag of Adelaide =

Australian municipal flag

Flag ratio: 1:2

House flag of the Adelaide Steamship Company

The armorial flag of Adelaide (Australia) was approved on August 2, 1982. It replaced the de facto decoration of the coat of arms on a white background which had been flown outside of the town hall and was used during special occasions prior to the replacement. The new flag was prepared by College of Arms and took its symbols from the city's coat of arms.

The flag contains a navy blue background divided into four quarters by a Saint George's Cross outlined in gold overlain with the Arms of the City of Adelaide. The flag is bordered on three sides by diagonal blue and gold stripes.

== See also ==
- Coat of arms of Adelaide
- List of Australian flags
