= Flag of New South Wales =

Australian state flag

New South Wales
- Flag of New South Wales
- Use: State flag
- Proportion: 1:2
- Adopted: 1876; 150 years ago
- Design: A British Blue Ensign defaced with the state badge in the fly

The current state flag of New South Wales was officially adopted in 1876. The flag is a defaced British Blue Ensign with the state badge located in the fly. The badge, based on the coat of arms, is a white disc with the cross of St George, a golden lion passant guardant in the centre of the cross and an eight-pointed gold star on each arm of the cross.

Badge of New South Wales

== Symbolism ==
As a variant of the Blue Ensign, the Union Jack is displayed in the canton. The St George's Cross, the Southern Cross and the 'Lion in the South' are displayed in the Badge of New South Wales on the flag. The St George's Cross is used on the ensign of the Royal Navy, and a golden, 8-pointed star is placed on each arm of the cross. This symbolises the maritime origins of New South Wales, with seafarers relying upon the Southern Cross to navigate the seas, and the role of the navy in protecting the state.

The 'Lion in the South' is taken from the three golden lions on a red field on the arms of England, and symbolises both the sovereignty of New South Wales and the offspring of an old country. It represents the origins of the founders of the Colony of New South Wales as well as the independence of their succeeding generations.

== History ==
The first flag of New South Wales was adopted in 1867. It too, was a defaced Blue Ensign, with the letters "NSW" in white located in the fly. The flag was a response to the passing of the Colonial Naval Defence Act 1865 which allowed any British colony its own warships and variant of the Blue Ensign.

New South Wales then adopted a second flag in 1870, almost identical to that of Victoria (with gold stars; 5, 6, 7, 8, 9 points). This flag was also a defaced Blue Ensign with the "Governor's Badge" located in the fly. The badge was the Southern Cross and an imperial crown situated above. The difference between this flag and the Victorian flag was that the stars were gold and ranged from five to nine points, with each star having one tip pointing to the bottom of the flag.

The present flag was adopted due to criticisms from the Admiralty that the previous design was too similar to the design of the Victorian flag.

The state badge was designed by the Colonial Architect James Barnet and Captain Francis Hixson, a retired Royal Navy officer.

=== Redesign proposal ===
In the mid-1990s, a series of proposals to redesign the New South Wales state flag emerged, gaining significant public attention in the lead-up to the 2000 Summer Olympics. The initiative, originally promoted by the Sydney Morning Herald in November 1996, aimed to address the perceived disconnect between the existing flag and the state's identity. The Herald argued that the flag designed served "a British rather than a NSW purpose" and failed to resonate with modern New South Wales' cultural identity and heritage.

In November 1996, two alternative flag designs were unveiled and displayed prominently to gauge public interest. One was inspired by the design of the Canadian flag, whilst the other included a Southern Cross. Both designs incorporated the Waratah.

Advocates of the redesign included former premiers, political leaders from both the Liberal and Labor parties, the Lord Mayor of Sydney, and notable sports figures. Supporters argued that a new flag would better reflect the state's evolving cultural and social identity, particularly as Sydney prepared to host the Olympics—a global showcase of the state's heritage.

However, the proposals also faced criticism. Traditionalists expressed concern that altering the flag would undermine historical continuity, while others feared it signalled an imminent move towards republicanism. A 1996 Herald AGB-McNair poll revealed that only 12% of New South Wales residents could accurately describe the existing flag, highlighting a potential lack of public attachment to its symbols.

In response to the debate, proponents suggested introducing legislation to authorize a public referendum on the flag redesign, potentially aligning the vote with the 1999 state election. This timeline would allow for extensive public discussion before a new flag could be adopted ahead of the 2000 Summer Olympics. Despite the momentum, the proposal ultimately did not progress beyond the discussion phase.

=== Historical New South Wales flags ===
Standard of the governor of New South Wales 1870–1876

Standard of the governor of New South Wales 1876–1981

Union Flag of Great Britain 1788–1800

Flag of New South Wales 1867–1870

Flag of New South Wales 1870–1876

New South Wales Ensign 1831–1883

New South Wales Customs Flag 1832–1882

New South Wales Customs Flag 1882–1901

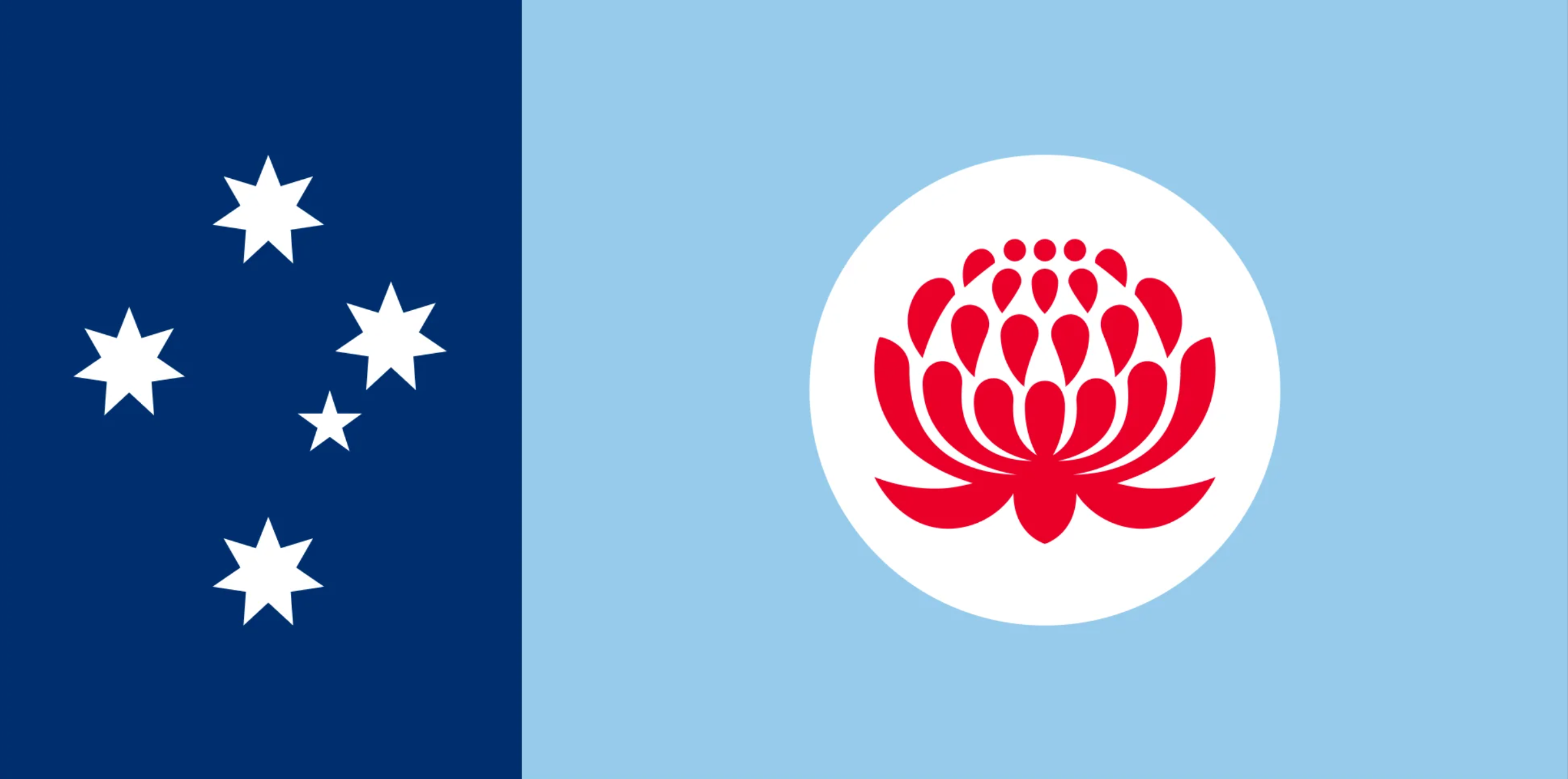
First flag proposal in 1996 by Flags for Australia

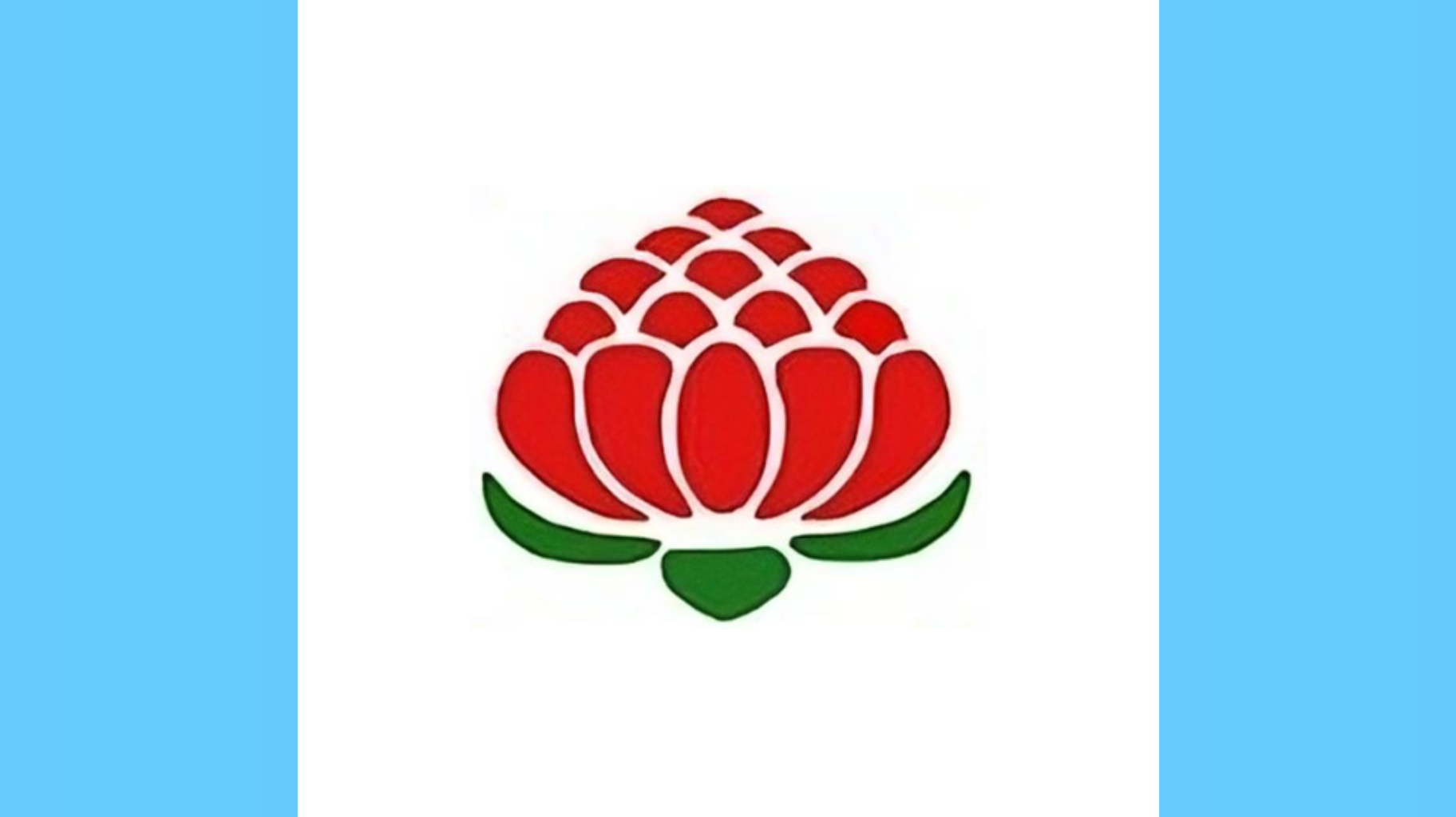
Second flag proposal in 1996 by Flags for Australia

== Other flags ==
Flag of the New South Wales State Emergency Service

Flag of the New South Wales Ambulance Service

Flag of the Royal Motor Yacht Club of New South Wales

House flag of Sydney Ferries

== See also ==
- Coat of arms of New South Wales
- List of Australian flags
- Flags of the governors of the Australian states
