= Flag of the governor-general of Australia =

Flag of the vice-regal representative of Australia

Governor-General’s Flag
- Use: Other
- Proportion: 1:2
- Adopted: 1 July 2024; 2 years ago
- Design: The Royal Crest, comprising a Tudor Crown surmounted by a crowned lion, above a golden scroll inscribed with “The Commonwealth of Australia”
- The governor-general’s flag during Queen Elizabeth II’s reign, featuring St Edward’s Crown
- Use: Other
- Proportion: 1:2
- Adopted: 1953
- Relinquished: 2024

The flag of the governor-general of Australia is an official flag of Australia and is flown continuously on buildings and other locations when the governor-general of Australia is present.

== History ==
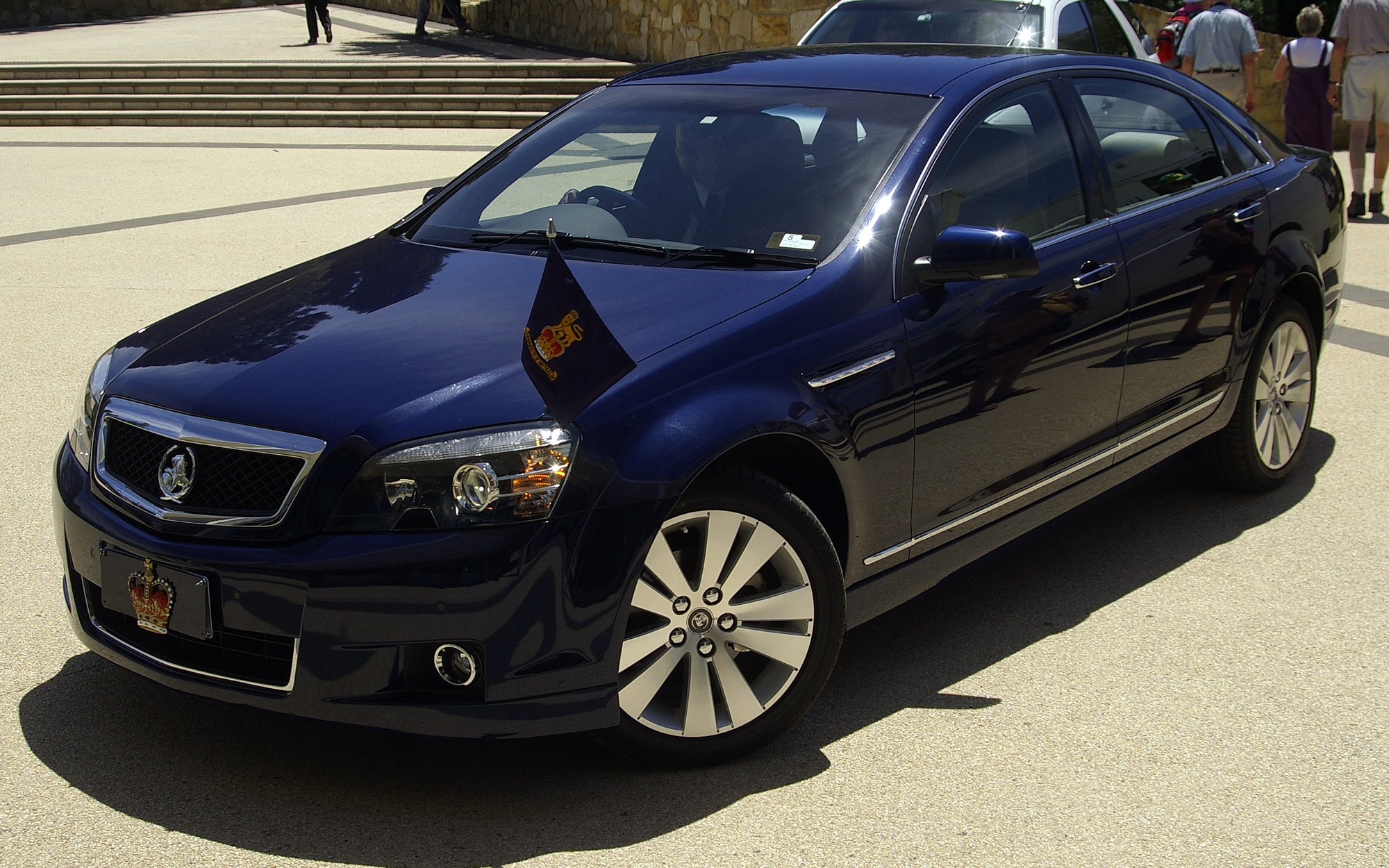
The flag of the governor-general affixed to a car

The flag has existed as three versions, the original flag used between 1902 and 1909 being a Union Flag defaced with a six pointed star, crowned, surrounded by ears of corn and a gold circlet. In 1909, following the addition of a seventh point to the Commonwealth Star on the Australian Blue and Red Ensigns, the star was changed to a seven-pointed star.

On 16 July 1936, the governor-general adopted a new flag for official use in Australia. The flag had a 1:2 ratio, it had a royal blue background and in the centre of the flag there is a Royal Crest (a crowned lion standing on a Tudor Crown) and the words "COMMONWEALTH OF AUSTRALIA" in dark blue letters on a gold scroll below the Crest. A similar design is used in most other Commonwealth realms.

In 1953 the flag was modified again, replacing the Tudor Crown with St Edward's Crown. The flag was otherwise identical to that introduced in 1936. The 1936 version of the flag was again adopted on 1 July 2024 after the installation of Governor-General Samantha Mostyn.

== Usage ==
The flag is flown continuously wherever the governor-general is in residence and is also used as a car flag.

== Historical versions ==
Flag	Date	Description
	1902–1909	A Union Flag defaced with a six pointed star, crowned, surrounded by ears of corn and a gold circlet. The crown used is the Tudor Crown.
	1909–1936	A Union Flag defaced with a seven pointed star, crowned, surrounded by ears of corn and a gold circlet. The crown used is the Tudor Crown.
	1936–1953	A lion statant guardant surmounted on the Tudor Crown on a blue field.
	1953–2024	A lion statant guardant surmounted upon St Edward's Crown on a blue field.
	2024–present	Reverted back to a lion statant guardant surmounted on the Tudor Crown on a blue field, but with a different arrangement of jewels.

== See also ==
- List of Australian flags
- Flags of the governors of the Australian states
- King's Flag for Australia
