= King's Flag for Australia =

Flag of the Australian monarch

- Use: Other
- Adopted: 30 August 2024; 2 years ago
- Design: The six quarters of the Commonwealth Coat of Arms, surrounded by an ermine border.

The King's Flag for Australia is the flag of Charles III in his capacity as King of Australia. It is used in an analogous way to the Royal Standard of the United Kingdom, indicating the monarch's presence in a building, vehicle or vessel while in Australia.

== History ==
Queen's Personal Australian Flag
- Use: Other
- Adopted: 20 September 1962; 64 years ago
- Relinquished: 8 September 2022; 4 years ago (on the death of Queen Elizabeth II)
- Design: The six quarters of the Commonwealth Coat of Arms, surrounded by an ermine border defaced with a gold federation star containing a blue disc
- Flag with proportions 22:31

Queen Elizabeth II was the first Australian monarch to adopt a personal flag for Australia. Her flag was approved for use on 20 September 1962, and used for the first time during the 1963 royal tour. Before this, the British royal standard was used. The personal flag of Queen Elizabeth differed from that of Charles III as it was defaced with a gold seven-pointed federation star with a blue disc containing the letter E below a crown, surrounded by a garland of golden roses. The star represented the states and territories. The blue disc was taken from the Queen's Personal Flag, used by her for duties as Head of the Commonwealth of Nations.

King Charles III similarly adopted an Australian flag to acknowledge his role as King of Australia. It was approved on 30 August 2024 and used for the first time on his inaugural royal tour to the country as monarch in October 2024.

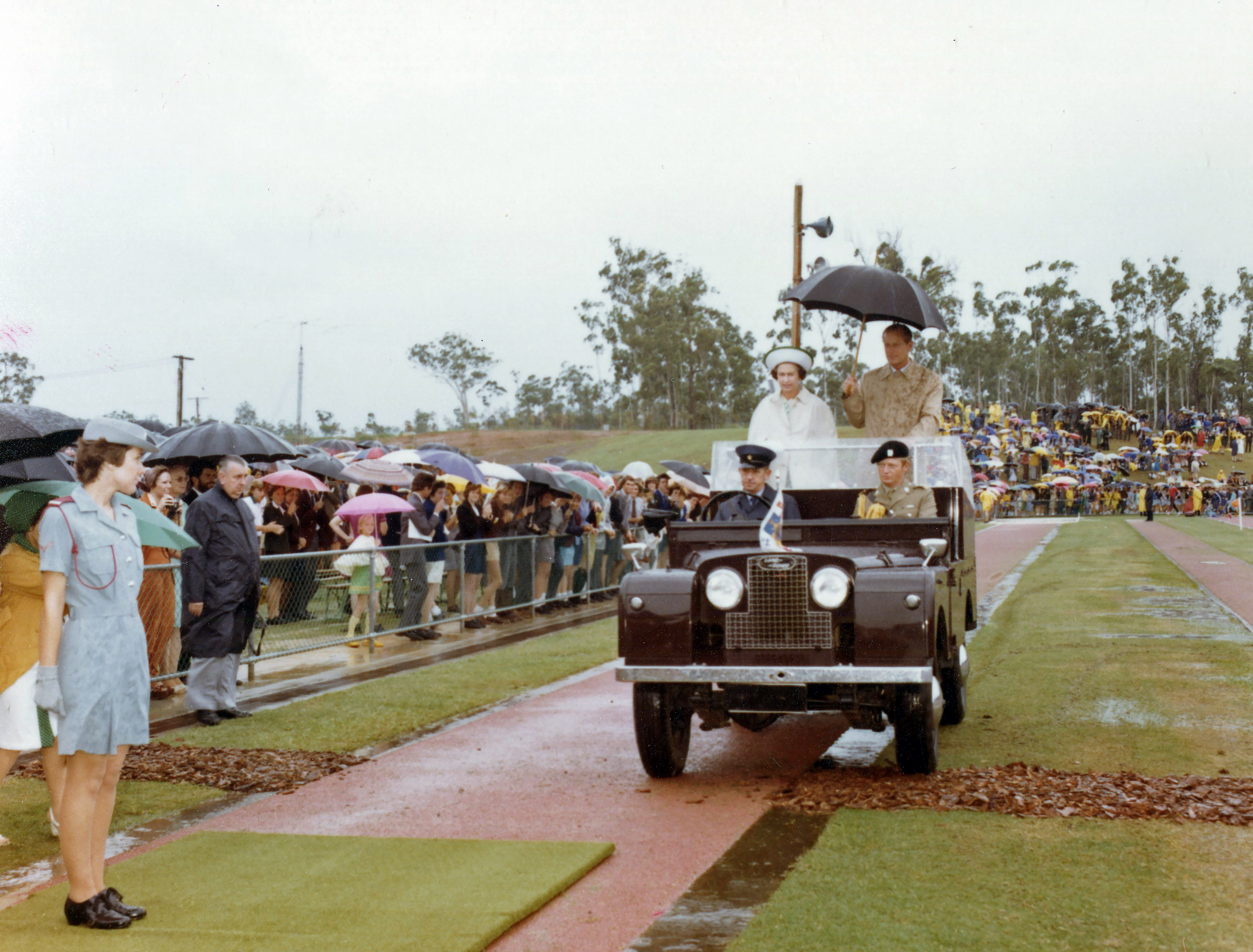
Elizabeth II's personal flag being used in Brisbane, 1982

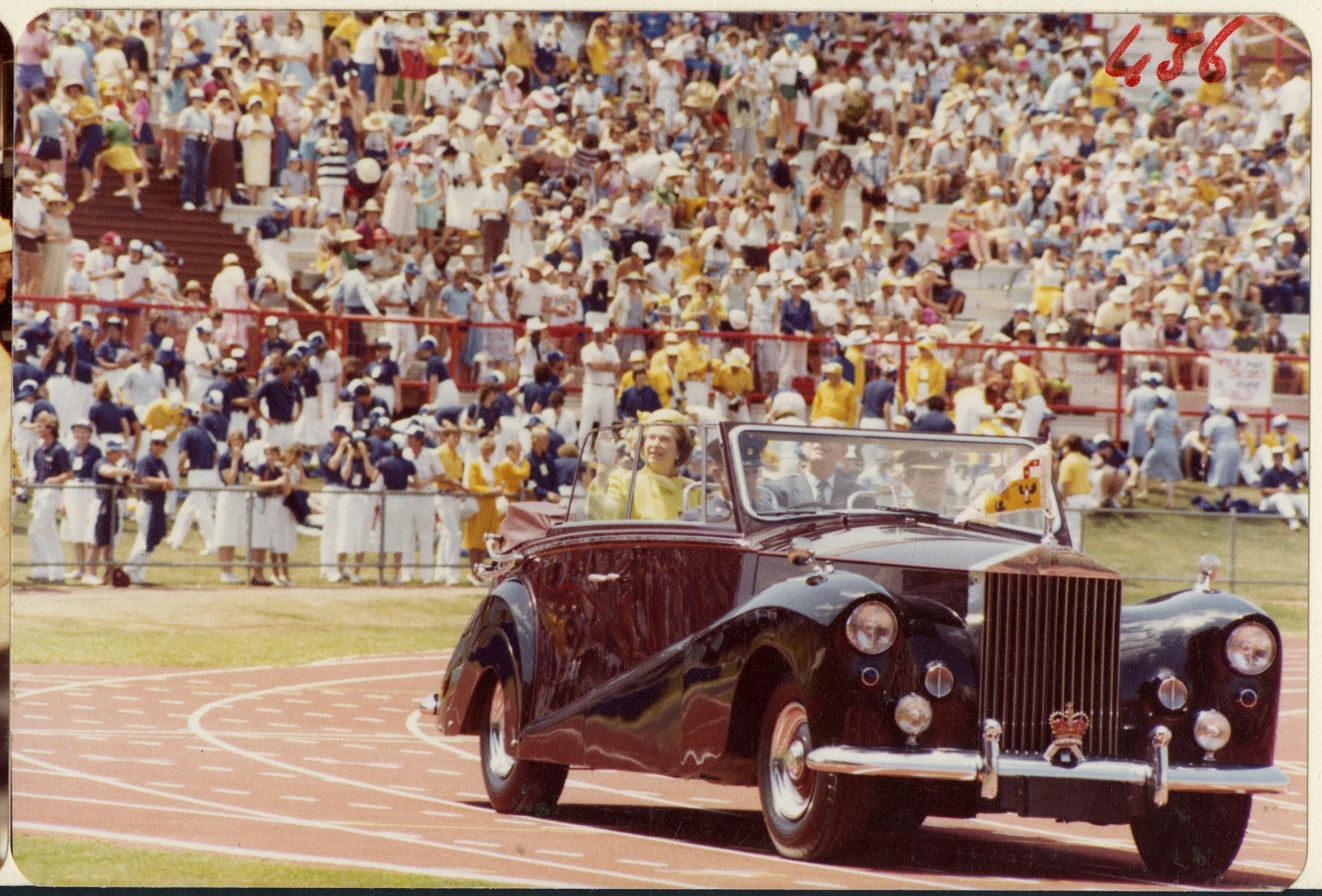
The flag being used by Elizabeth II during the 1982 Commonwealth Games in Brisbane

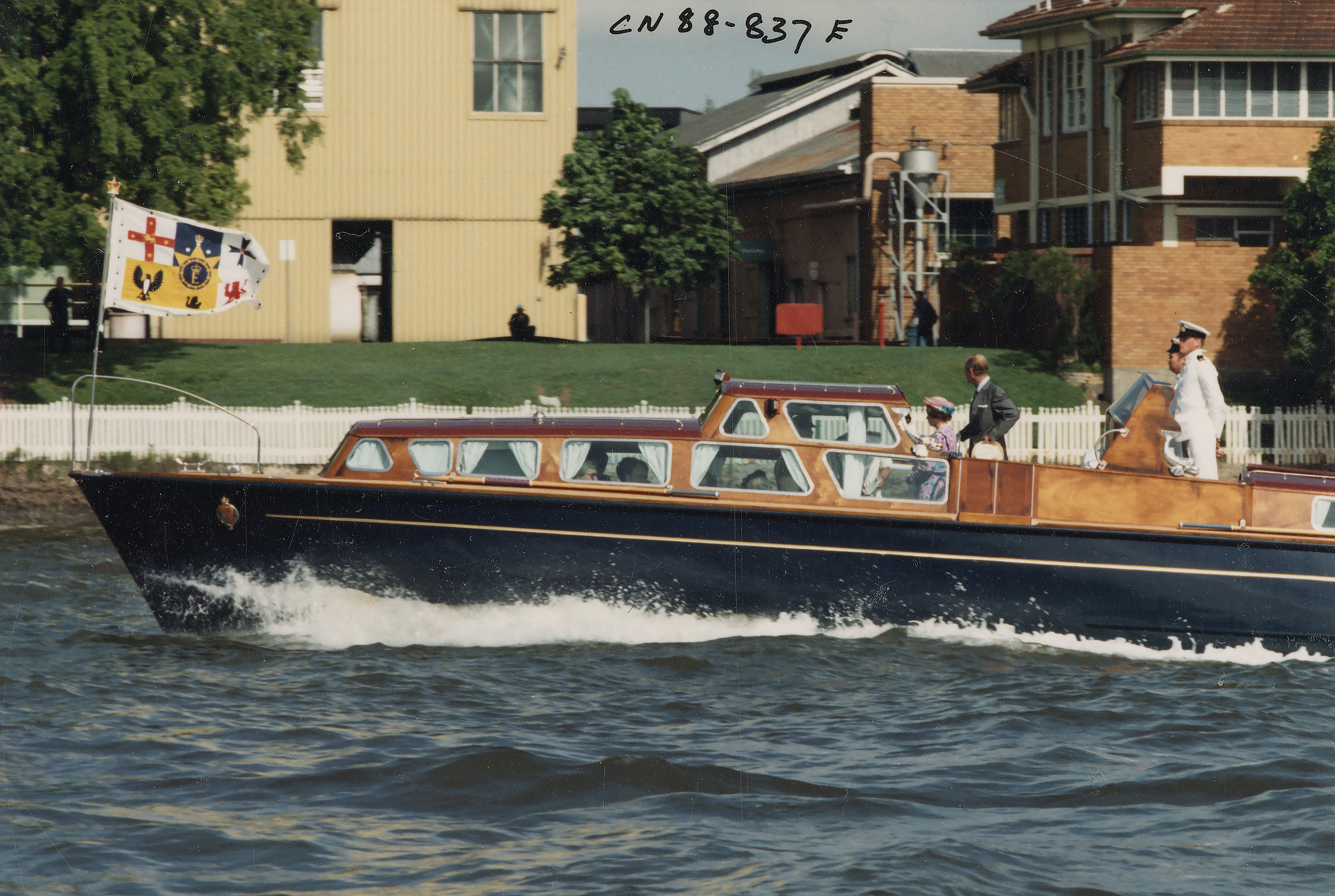
The flag being used on a vessel carrying Elizabeth II, 1988

== Description ==
The King's Flag is the device upon the escutcheon of the arms of Australia in banner form.

The King's Flag consists of a banner of the device upon the arms of Australia.

Each of the six sections of the flag represents the heraldic badge of one of the six Australian states, and the whole is surrounded by an ermine border representing the federation of the states:

- The upper left represents New South Wales and bears a red St George's Cross, upon which is a gold lion in the centre and a gold star on each arm.
- The upper middle represents Victoria and contains a crown and five white stars on a blue field.
- The upper right represents Queensland and consists of a blue Maltese cross, bearing a crown, on a white field.
- The lower left represents South Australia and includes a piping shrike on a gold field.
- The lower middle represents Western Australia and consists of a black swan on a gold field with wings up.
- The lower right represents Tasmania and contains a red lion on a white field.

== Use ==
The King's Flag for Australia is used when the king is visiting Australia, on Royal Australian Navy vessels, on official buildings, cars and aircraft that the king occupies. (Note: Queen Elizabeth's Personal Flag was also used once in the UK during a church service to celebrate the 100th anniversary of the passage of the Commonwealth of Australia Constitution Act 1900.) When it is flown on or outside a building, it should be the only flag present. The flag has also been used to indicate the symbolic presence of the monarch, such as during presentations of the King's colours during the Trooping the Colour. The king's colours symbolically are equivalent to the presence of the monarch.

== Coronation and jubilee standards ==
During the coronation ceremony of the monarch at Westminster Abbey, the standards of various countries are carried by various officials in the procession inside the abbey. These flags are the country's coat of arms as a banner of arms. For Australia, similar standards based on the current and previous coat of arms were used thrice: at the coronations of King George V, King George VI and Queen Elizabeth II in 1911, 1937, and 1953, respectively. The banner of the 1908–1912 coat of arms was used in 1911, with the banner of the current arms used in 1937 and 1953. The banner was in a 3:4 ratio and without defacement. At the 2023 coronation of King Charles III, the Australian national flag was used to represent Australia.

Australian coronation and jubilee standards

1911 Coronation Standard

1935 jubilee standard, 1937 and 1953 Coronation Standard

2023 Coronation Standard

== See also ==
- List of Australian flags
- Flags of Elizabeth II
- Flags of Charles III
- Flag of the governor-general of Australia
- Flags of the governors of the Australian states
