= Coat of arms of Adelaide =

Coat of arms of the City of Adelaide
- Armiger: Lord Mayor of Adelaide
- Adopted: 1929
- Crest: Right arm holding Miner’s Pick and Mural Crown
- Torse: Blue and Gold
- Shield: Red and Gold Cross, Ship, Fleece, Wheat Sheaf and Bull's head
- Supporters: Lion and Kangaroo
- Compartment: Grassy Green Field
- Motto: Ut Prosint Omnibus Conjuncti

The coat of arms of Adelaide was granted by the Heralds' College on 20 April 1929.

== Blazon ==
=== Shield ===
The arms consist of a blue shield with a gold cross, which is surmounted by a red cross.

- The top left corner, or first quarter, shows a three-masted ship in full sail. The ship represents the importance of commerce to the city and is a reminder of the form of transport of the early settlers from Great Britain to South Australia, and of any return voyage, as well as being the mail link between the two countries.
- The top right corner, or second quarter, shows a Golden Fleece, representing the sheep farming interest and the wool trade.
- The lower left corner, or third quarter, shows a bull's head, representing the cattle interests.
- The lower right corner, or fourth quarter, shows a golden wheatsheaf in full ear. It represents the extensive agricultural interests.

=== Crest ===
Above the shield is a golden mural crown, which is a common element in the arms of municipalities.

Above the mural crown is the crest of the corporation. It is a right arm holding a miner's pick, representing another of the industries of the early years which contributed so much to the wealth of South Australia and Adelaide. The arm is resting on a wreath of the colours of the city, namely blue and gold.

=== Supporters ===
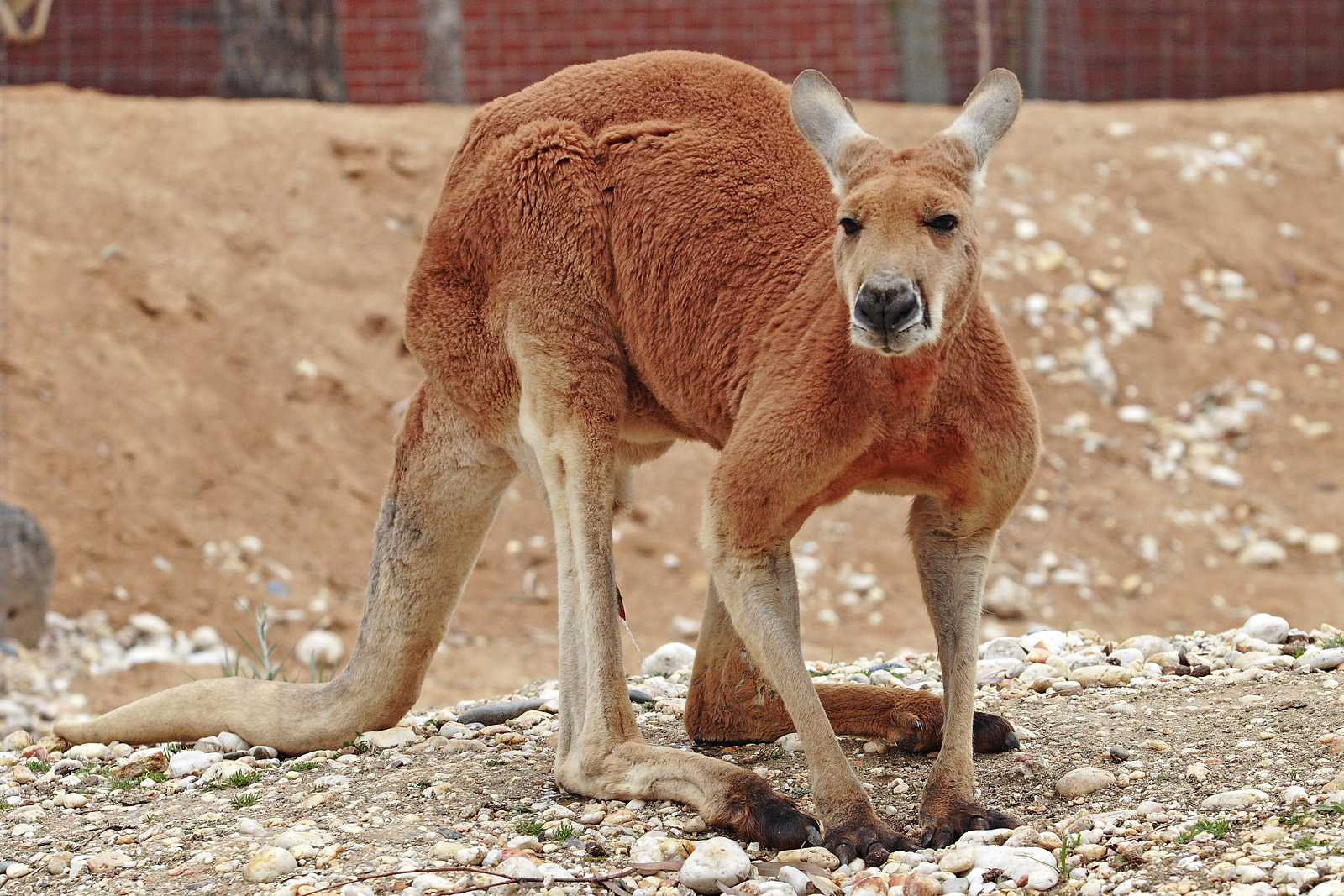
Male red kangaroo

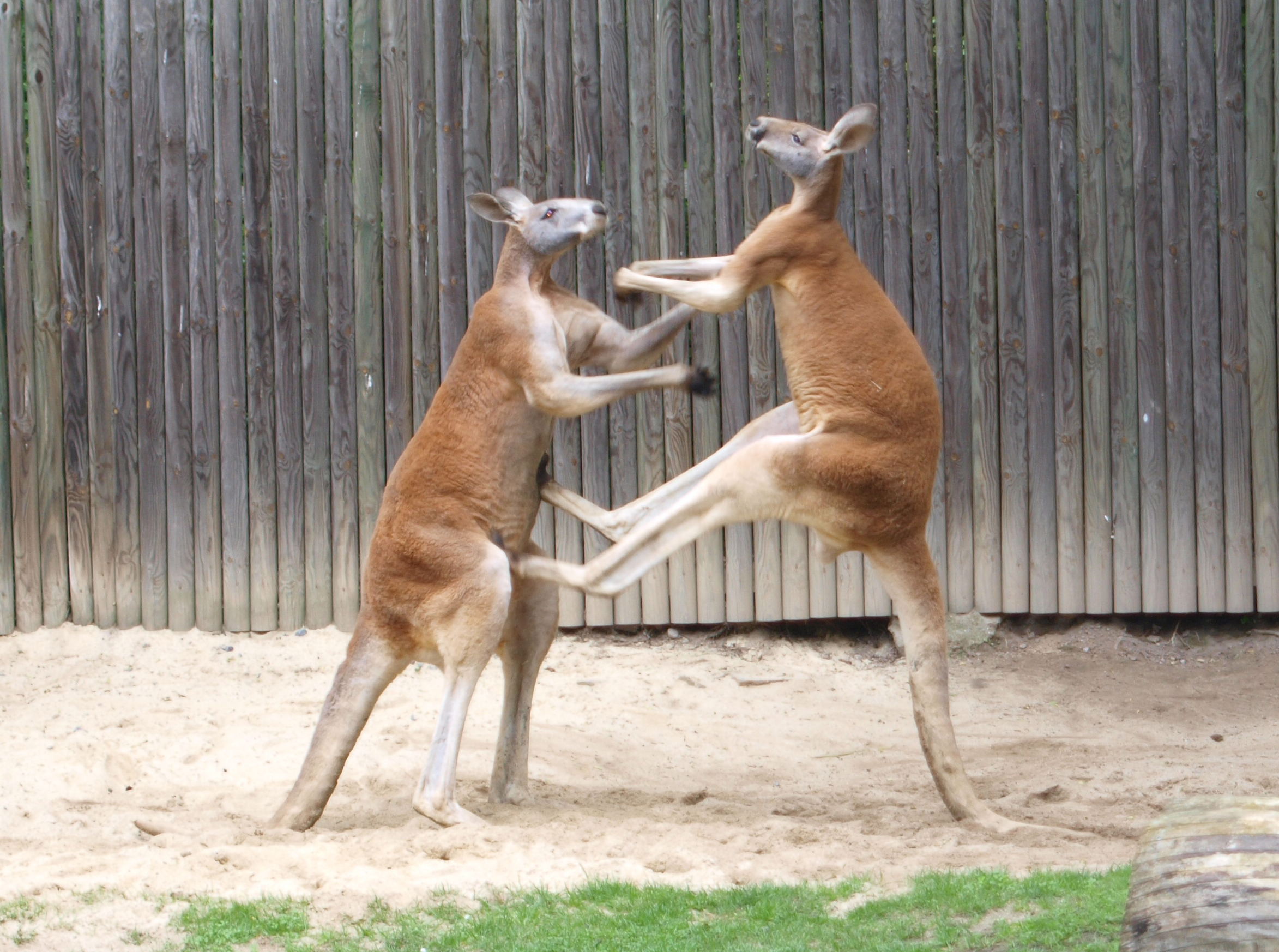
Two male red kangaroos fighting

On the right side of the shield there is a red kangaroo, and on the left side a lion, which guard and uphold the shield.

The lion represents the English colonists of South Australia and the kangaroo represents the country they helped to build.

The lion simultaneously represents Aion, the god of time, and the lion of dominion.

The red kangaroo represents the Kaurna people's totem, the red kangaroo dreaming.

=== Base ===
The base of the shield stands on a grassy green field of rising ground.

=== Motto ===
A scroll below the arms has a Latin motto Ut Prosint Omnibus Conjuncti which translates as "united for the common good".

== See also ==
- Flag of Adelaide
- Coat of arms of South Australia
- Australian heraldry
