= Women's sport in New South Wales =

Women's sport in New South Wales was first organised statewide in 1933. Coverage of women's sport in the state media lags behind that of men. Discrimination based on gender is allowed for sport in the state. The University of Sydney has women's sport history dating back to the 1890s.

== History ==
The first major sport statewide organisation for women was created in 1933 with the creation of the New South Wales Women's Amateur Sports Council. The council's first patron was Gwendolyn Game. The role of this council was to serve as a women's sport lobbying group to get state and local councils, and sporting clubs to create or improve facilities for women and to create greater opportunities for women in sport. In 1930, a field hockey camp was held for metro and country New South Wales. In 1955, at the invitation of the New South Wales Women's Hockey Association, England's national team coach visited the state and held several coaching clinics. A coaching scheme was developed following this tour. 62 women had completed the course by 1957. In 1984, the Premier of New South Wales decided to ban a bout between two women kickboxers citing clause 27.1 in the Theatre and Public Halls Act 1908 relating to preservation of good manners and decorum. A complaint was filed with the New South Wales Anti-Discrimination Board by cricketer Denise Annetts in January 1994 alleging she was not selected for the national team because she was a heterosexual.

== Media and the law ==
A study of sport coverage in rural New South Wales found coverage of sports favored men's sport, with coverage for women being less than that of horse sports and slightly more than dog racing. From 1890 to 1990, there was an increase in women's sport coverage in the Newcastle Herald from 3.2% of all sport coverage to 15.7%.

The 1996 New South Wales Anti-discrimination Against Transgendered Persons Act allows for gender discrimination in sport.

== University sport ==
At the University of Sydney, there were two parallel sport organised dating back to the 1890s. One was for men, the Sports Union, and one was for women, the Women's Sport Associations. Attempts were made to merge them during the 1890s, in 1922 for economic reasons, in 1934 and 1973. None of these efforts were successful. During the 1960s and again in the 1970s, membership in the Women's Sport Association the University of Sydney doubled. In 1982, the organisation would give out awards for the first time for the sportswoman and sport-team of the year. In 1971, the women's volleyball club was created, with the mountaineering, orienteering and canoe club being founded two years later. The Canoe club would separate in 1976, and the women's gymnastics and trampoline club was founded in 1970. A women's soccer club and women's boardsailing club were founded in 1980. The women's rockclimbing club and women's powerlifting club were founded in 1984. The women's Aikido club was founded a year later. The women's Tae Kwon Do Club, and women's triathlon club were founded in 1989. A year later, the women's water ski club was founded. The women's touch football club was founded in 1992. The women's cycling club was founded in 1993 and merged with the triathlon club in 1995. The women's rugby club was founded in 1994. During the 1990s, members of the Women's Sport Association often outperformed their male counterparts when competing in international competitions.

Women who came out of the Association's clubs included water polo players Jenny MacGregor, Julie Sheperd, Cathy Parkes, Naomi Woodberry and Cathy Turner, and sailor Adrienne Cahalan.
