= Bowman flag =

Historical Australian flag

The Bowman flag

The complex Bowman flag with its swallow-tail fly was designed by John and Honor Bowman of Richmond NSW in 1806. The shield on the design shows the rose of England, thistle of Scotland and shamrock of Ireland. It commemorates (by the motto England expects that every man will do his duty) the Royal Navy's victory at the Battle of Trafalgar (21 October 1805), a landmark event for Britain's Australasian colonies. The design was hand painted, in oils, on silk made from Honor Bowman's wedding dress. The flag is preserved in the Mitchell Library, State Library of New South Wales, Sydney. The design was an inspiration for Australia's national coat of arms which features a shield showing the six Australian state badges supported by an emu and a kangaroo.

== See also ==
- List of Australian flags
