= Coat of arms of Melbourne =

Coat of arms of the city of Melbourne
- Armiger: Lord mayor, councillors and citizens of Melbourne
- Adopted: 9 February 1843 (unofficially); 1940 (officially); 18 March 1970 (altered)
- Crest: Mural crown and Kangaroo
- Torse: Silver and Red
- Shield: Red cross with Royal Crown, Fleece, Black Bull, Whale and Ship
- Supporters: Two Lions
- Compartment: None
- Motto: Latin: Vires Acquirit Eundo

The coat of arms of Melbourne is an official symbol of the City of Melbourne, Australia. They were granted to the corporation of the city by letters patent on 30 January 1940.

== Blazon ==
=== Arms ===
On a silver shield, a red cross (the cross of St George) with a narrow red bar is adjacent and parallel with each side of the cross. On the central part of the cross is a Royal Crown.

And in the four-quarters, there are:

- The top left corner (first quarter), there is a fleece hanging from a red ring.
- The top right corner (second quarter), there is a black bull standing on a hillock.
- The lower left corner (third quarter), there is a spouting whale swimming in the sea.
- The lower right corner (fourth quarter), There is a three-masted ship in full-sail.

=== Crest ===
Above the shield is the iron helmet with red and silver mantling and above the helmet there is the silver and red wreath, and on the wreath there is a gold mural crown, which is a symbol of municipal government. Out of the mural crown rises the upper half of a kangaroo, facing the left side of the shield and looking backwards over its shoulder.

=== Supporters ===
There is a gold lion on each side of the shield, upright on its hind legs and with a black crown. Around each lion's neck is a red collar on which there are two five-pointed silver stars. A red chain, attached at the top to the collar, passes over each lion's back and body.

=== Motto ===
A scroll below the arms reads 'Vires Acquirit Eundo' which translates as 'It acquires strength by going' (a quotation from Vergil's Aeneid, which in the original context refers to Fama, or Rumour personified).

== See also ==
- Flag of Melbourne
- Coat of arms of Victoria
- Australian heraldry
