= Flags of the governors of the Australian states =

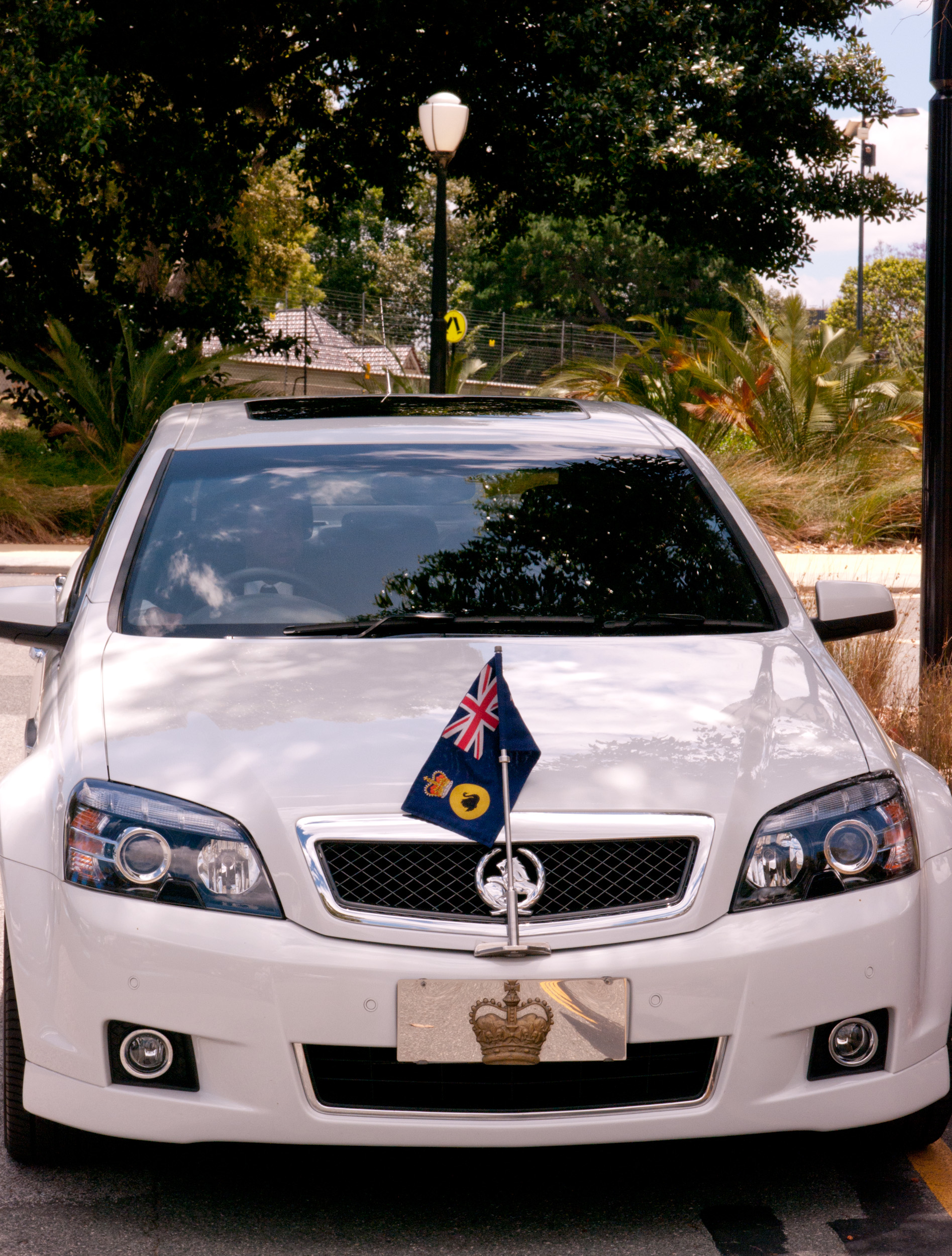
The flag of the governor of Western Australia affixed to a car

The governors of the Australian states, who represent their respective head of state (the King of Australia), have a personal flag in that role. With the exception of Queensland's, the current design of these flags originate from the 1970s and 1980s.

== History ==
The governors of British colonies have historically used as their personal flag the Union Flag defaced in the centre with a local badge or coat of arms to represent their status as vice-regal representative in that colony. In the then Australasian colonies, the governors used the colonial badge encircled in a laurel wreath. After federation, when the Australian colonies became states of the Commonwealth of Australia, the governors continued using their earlier flags.

During the 1970s and 80s, the states, with the exception of Queensland, moved away from the British colonial model. This was in line with the constitutional developments of the time, which culminated in the Australia Act 1986, which ended the states' constitutional status as individual colonies of the United Kingdom. Since the passing of the Act, the governors of the Australian states have ceased to have any constitutional relationship with the government of the United Kingdom, and represent the monarch in his or her capacity of sovereign of each of the individual states.

== Standards ==
The state governors’ flag or standard in most states is the same as the state's flag but with a graphical representation of a royal crown above the badge. The flags of Victoria and Queensland already contain a crown, and so these states use different models: the governor of Victoria's flag uses a gold ensign with the stars of the Southern Cross in red, whereas the governor of Queensland's flag maintains the old defaced Union Jack.

New South Wales	Queensland	South Australia	Tasmania	Victoria	Western Australia
1870–1876	1870–1876	1870–1876	1875–1876	1870–1877	1870–1953
1876–1981	1876–1901	1876–1904	1876–1977	1877–1903	1953–1988
1981–present	1901–1953	1904–1975	1977–present	1903–1953	1988–2025
	1953–present	1975–2024		1953–1984	2025–present
		2024–present		1984–present	

== See also ==
- List of Australian flags
- Flag of the governor-general of Australia
- King's Flag for Australia
