= Commonwealth Star =

Seven-pointed star symbolising the Federation of Australia

Commonwealth Star as the crest of coat of arms of Australia

The Commonwealth Star (also known as the Federation Star, the Seven Pointed Star or the Star of Federation) is a seven-pointed star and heraldic device symbolising the Federation of Australia which came into force on 1 January 1901, originally as a six-pointed star.

Six points of the star represent the six original states of the Commonwealth of Australia, while the seventh point represents the territories and any other future states of Australia. The original star had only six points; however, the proclamation in 1905 of the Territory of Papua led to the addition of the seventh point in 1909 to represent it and future territories.

The Commonwealth Star is one of the elements of the Australian flag and also features on the Australian coat of arms.

== Usage ==
The Commonwealth Star is found on both the flag of Australia and the coat of arms of Australia. On the Australian flag the Star appears in the lower hoist quarter, beneath the Union Flag. In the coat of arms, the Star forms the crest, atop a blue and gold wreath. The Star also appears on the badges of the Australian Defence Force and Australian Federal Police.

The Star is also used on numerous Australian medals, including the National Police Service Medal, the Defence Force Service Medal, the civilian Star of Courage, the Public Service Medal, the Ambulance Service Medal and the Australian Police Medal.

The coat of arms of Queen Mary Donaldson, spouse of King Frederik X of Denmark, includes two Commonwealth Stars, to symbolise the Queen's Australian heritage.

== Gallery ==
Flag of Australia

Australian coat of arms (adopted 1912)

1908 coat of arms

Queen's Personal Australian Flag (used between 1962 and 2022)

Flag of the governor-general of Australia (used between 1908 and 1936)

Ribbon for Defence Force Service Medal with Federation Star (5th clasp)

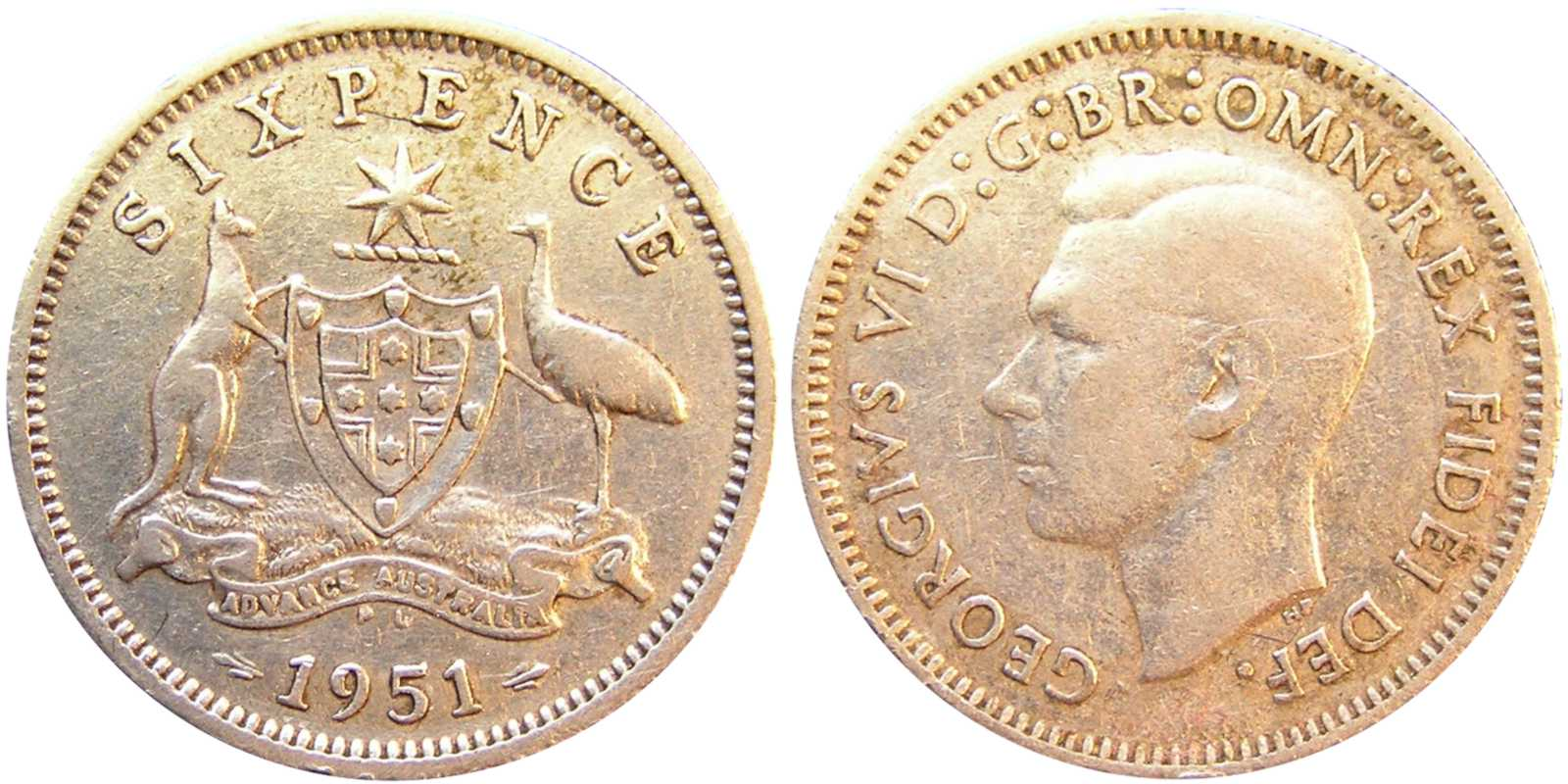
Australian 1951 six pence coin

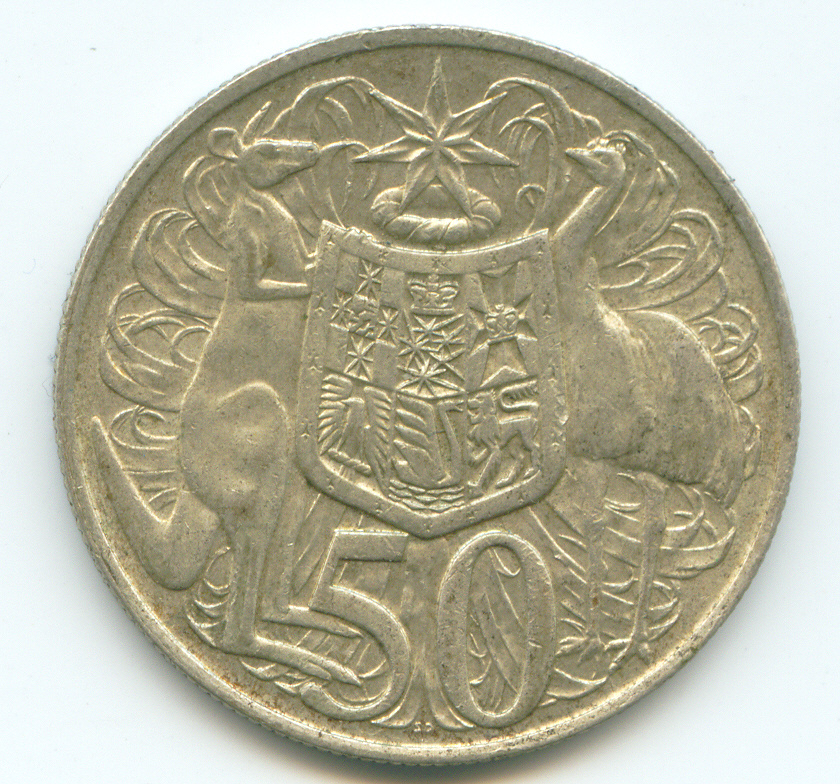
1966 Australian 50 cent coin (round)

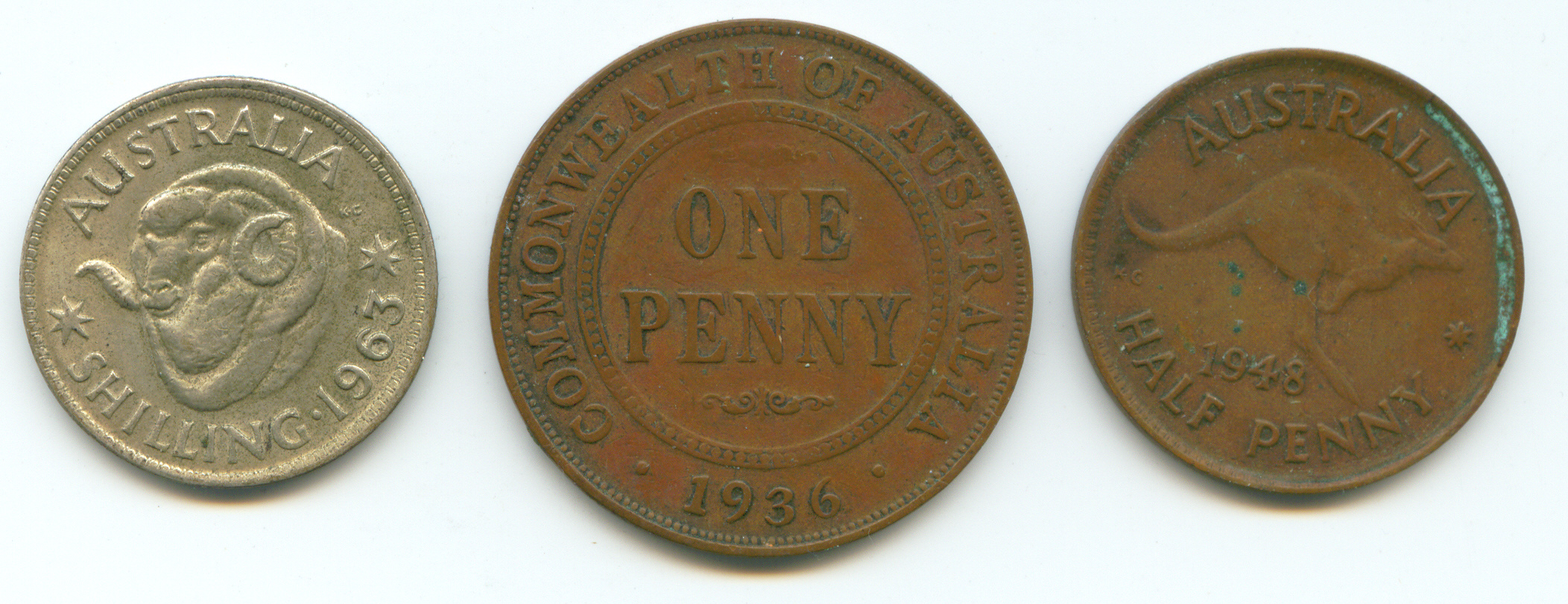
Coins of the Australian pound

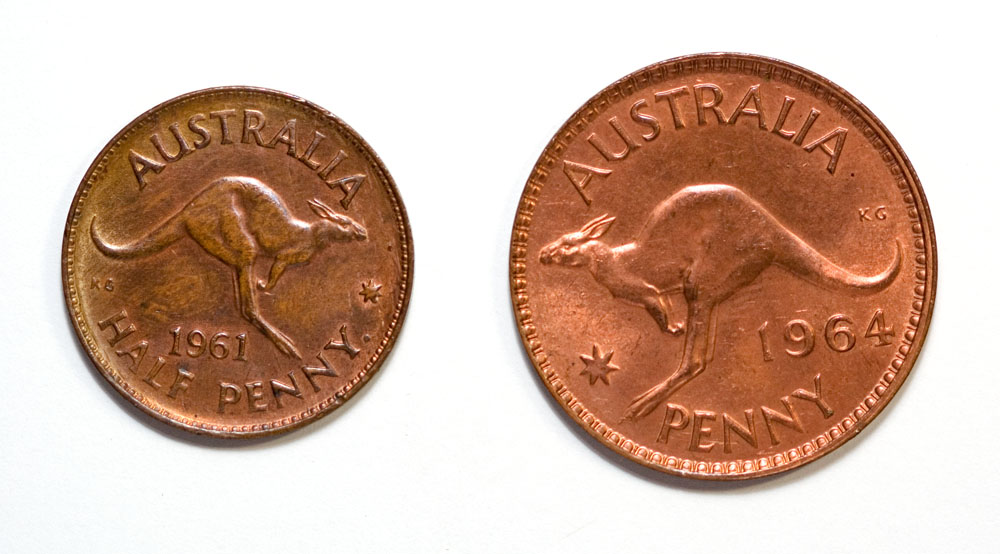
Halfpenny and penny

== See also ==
- Southern Cross
- Southern Horizon
