= Australian flag debate =

Debate on changing the Australian national flag

Poster released by Ausflag prior to the 2000 Sydney Olympics, displaying some of the many other flags containing the Union Jack in the canton

The Australian flag debate is a question over whether the Australian flag should be changed, particularly to remove the Union Jack from the canton, but also to possibly introduce a completely new design without the Southern Cross.

The debate has often arisen in connection with the issue of republicanism in Australia. It has come to a head on a number of occasions, such as the period immediately preceding the Australian Bicentenary in 1988 and during the prime ministership of Paul Keating, who had publicly raised the topic of flag change during the early 1990s.

== Arguments for a new flag ==
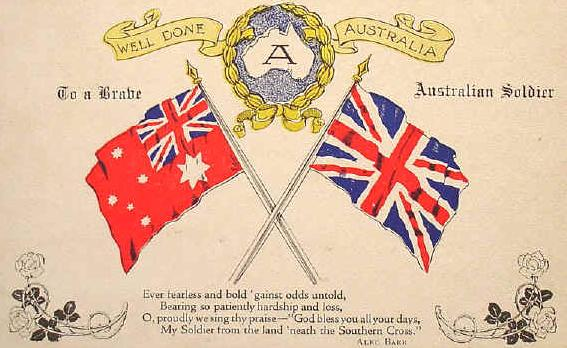
A 1918 World War I-era Australian postcard congratulating Australia on winning the war; includes the Union Jack and the Australian Red Ensign

The case for changing the flag has been led by the organisation known as Ausflag. The organisation has not consistently supported one design but is opposed to the Eureka Flag and has sponsored a number of design competitions to develop alternative flag candidates.

Supporters of changing the flag have made the following arguments:

- The flag is not distinctive because it contains the national flag of another country in a position of prominence. In particular, the flag is difficult to distinguish from a variety of flags based on the British Blue Ensign, most notably the national flag of New Zealand and the state flag of Victoria. For example, when Australian prime minister Bob Hawke visited Canada in 1984, Ottawa was mistakenly decked out with New Zealand flags in his honour. The Australian Monarchist League, during their "No" campaign for the Australian republic referendum in 1999, displayed the New Zealand flag instead of the Australian flag in one of their pamphlets. Again in 2013, the Australian Monarchist League mistakenly captioned the New Zealand flag as being the Australian flag on their website.
- It does not accurately connote Australia's status as an independent nation. The Union Jack at the canton suggests Australia is a British colony or dependency. New Zealand, Tuvalu and Fiji are the only other independent nations in the world to feature the Union Jack on their national flags. Other Commonwealth countries whose flags originally depicted the Union Jack have since changed them without becoming republics, while Canada, whose unofficial pre-1965 national flag was the Canadian Red Ensign, also adopted a new flag design without becoming a republic. The Australian flag's colours of red, white and blue are neither Australia's official national colours (green and gold) nor its traditional heraldic colours (blue and gold).
- The current design of the flag acts as reminder of the history of unjust treatment towards Indigenous Australians, with Aboriginal activist Lowitja O'Donoghue arguing in the 1990s that it symbolises "dispossession and oppression" and that it "doesn’t reflect the reality of [modern] Australian life".
- The Australian flag was not historically the prime national symbol. For most of the time since Federation, it was flown alongside the British Union Jack which took precedence as the national flag from 1924 to 1954. Until the late 1920s, the Australian Federation Flag remained more popular than the Australian flag for public and even some official events. For example, the Federation Flag was flown during the 1927 visit to Australia of the Duke and Duchess of York. The number of points of the stars have varied since 1901 and the present blue version was not adopted as the "national" flag until 1954. Before then, the Union Jack took precedence and confusion reigned between whether the red or blue version of the Australian flag was to be preferred, with the red often winning out.
- It is wrong to claim that Australians have "fought and died under the flag", given that during most of the wars Australians have been involved in, they have usually "fought under" various British flags or the Australian Red Ensign. Prior to 1941 only 10 percent of military ensigns were Blue and in 1945 Red ensigns were flown along the route of the official end of war parades. The flag made in secret by the Changi prisoners-of-war was a red ensign. The coffins of Australia's war dead were draped with the Union Jack.
- Although the flag was designed by four Australians, including two teenagers, and a man from New Zealand and chosen through a public competition, the choice of designs was not completely free. Specifically, the conditions of entry for the Review of Reviews and subsequent government competition, were highly suggestive that the winning design must include the Union Jack and Southern Cross. Additionally, final approval lay with King Edward VII and the British Admiralty, because both the red and blue versions were considered naval ensigns.
- There are 56 countries in the Commonwealth of Nations – only five of them, including the United Kingdom, have the Union Jack in their own flag.

== Arguments for the current flag ==
The Australian Federation Flag (1831) was used by Sir Henry Parkes and the federation movement and featured the Southern Cross and Union Jack in combination

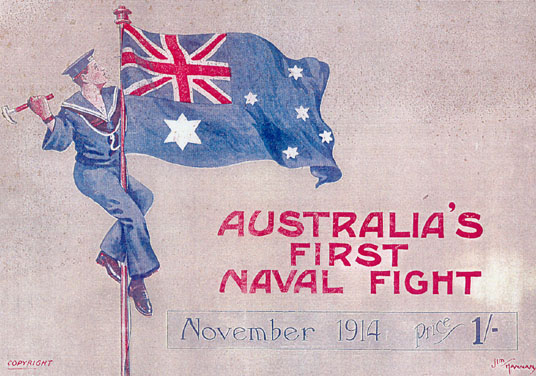
Postcard commemorating the naval victory of Australian light cruiser HMAS Sydney over the German light cruiser Emden at the Battle of Cocos in 1914

The Australian National Flag Association was formed to maintain the status quo.

Opponents of changing the flag have made the following arguments:

- It is a popular symbol. No alternative national flag has attained the same degree of acceptance accorded to the existing flag.
- The flag is a unique combination of devices recognised by law, custom and tradition as Australia's chief national symbol. It represents all Australian citizens regardless of background, race, religion or age.
- According to Nigel Morris of the Australian Flag Society, it is of historical importance, being the flag "that Australia has grown up under, and the flag that has been associated with all of her many achievements on the international scene".
- The flag is popular generally, and has particular support among young Australians, who do not appear to consider it a colonial symbol. The flag was the first national flag ever produced by a competition amongst the citizens themselves. The three elements of the flag represent Australia's heritage and values: the Southern Cross indicates Australia's geographic position, and is highly significant in Aboriginal mythology; the Union Jack acknowledges the large British settlements, which brought with them the national language, parliamentary government, and the rule of law; the "Commonwealth Star" represents the shared democratic future, the "ballot not the bullet".
- It was chosen through an open public competition. The competition was won by five entrants who had submitted similar designs, four Australians and a man from New Zealand, who would share the honour of being declared the designers.

== Southern Cross ==
The Eureka Flag

The Southern Cross is thought to represent Australia's position in the Southern Hemisphere (see Southern Cross flag). It has been used as a symbol of Australia since in the 1820s when there were crown colonies of the British Empire in Australia. The National Colonial Flag for Australia was the first such concept to depict the Southern Cross.

Some claim that the Southern Cross is not explicitly Australian but could represent any nation in the Southern Hemisphere. As well as the Australian flag, it also already appears on the flags of Brazil, Papua New Guinea, Samoa, New Zealand and the Mercosur trade bloc.

== History ==
When the winning entry to the 1901 Federal Flag Design Competition was announced the initial reception was mixed. The then-republican magazine The Bulletin labelled it:

a staled réchauffé of the British flag, with no artistic virtue, no national significance ... Minds move slowly: and Australia is still Britain's little boy. What more natural than that he should accept his father's cut-down garments, – lacking the power to protest, and only dimly realising his will. That bastard flag is a true symbol of the bastard state of Australian opinion.

Melbourne Herald competition winning design	Blue version of winning design	As approved by King Edward VII

Initially the Department of Defence resisted, considering it to be a marine ensign and favouring King's Regulations that specified the use of the Union Jack. After being approached by the Department of Defence, Prime Minister Chris Watson stated in parliament that he was not satisfied with the design of the Australian flag and that implementation of the 1904 resolution could wait until consideration was given to "adopt another [flag] which in our opinion is more appropriate."

On 14 April 1954 the Flags Act 1953 was introduced by the Menzies government and became law with bipartisan support. It formally designated the current flag as the "Australian National Flag" and gave it priority for the first time over the Union Jack. This formalised the transition from the Union Jack as the pre-eminent national symbol, which began in 1941 with the lifting of restrictions on flying the red and blue ensigns, followed by the designation by then prime minister Chifley of the blue ensign as the "national emblem" in 1947 and finally the decision of the Menzies Cabinet in 1950 to proclaim the blue ensign the "Australian National Flag" and present one to every school for the 50 year anniversary of Federation.

Flag proposed by the Republican Socialist League in 1956

One of the first proposals for a new Australian flag with the Union Jack removed was made in 1956 by the Republican Socialist League. It removed the Union Jack and it replaced with a slightly larger Commonwealth Star.

The Bulletin magazine launched an Australian National Flag Quest on 1 August 1971 in time for the visit of Queen Elizabeth II to open the Sydney Opera House in October 1973; 10 designs were chosen from the 2,000 submitted and these were displayed by major stores in the capital cities and main provincial centres during 1972.

In July 1982 changing the flag became official Labor Party policy, after being included in the party's official platform at that year's National Conference.

The prime minister, Bob Hawke, subsequently announced in the House of Representatives that the design of the Australian flag would not be reviewed by the Australian government before or during the bicentenary year, with the commitment dropped in the National Platform of 1988.

Later, the debate was revived in the Labor Party with the change to Paul Keating as prime minister, who publicly championed the cause of a new flag. On an official visit to Indonesia he said:

I do not believe that the symbols and the expression of the full sovereignty of Australian nationhood can ever be complete while we have a flag with the flag of another country on the corner of it.

On 6 June 1994, the Sydney Morning Herald reported cabinet minister Kim Beazley, as saying that the Labor government was committed to its timetable for changes to Australia's flag by the Centenary of Federation in 2001; however, beyond commissioning a national survey that year, no further action was taken.

In the 1997 film Event Horizon, set in the year 2047, Sam Neill, playing an Australian astronaut, wears an Australian flag patch on his spacesuit with the Union Jack in the canton replaced with the Australian Aboriginal flag. This was Neill's suggestion, as he thought the flag might have been changed by that point in the future.

In 1998, the Howard Government amended the Flags Act 1953 to require a public vote before the Australian flag could be changed, after unsuccessfully supporting several private members' bills with the same effect whilst in opposition. Additionally, the government advised the governor-general proclaim 3 September Australian National Flag Day in 1996. In 2002, the Howard government supplied ANFA's promotional video free to all primary schools and in 2004 required all schools receiving federal funds to fly the Australian flag.

Malcolm Turnbull, former chairman (1993–2000) of the Australian Republican Movement and head of the official "Yes" case committee for the 1999 Australian republic referendum, left the board of Ausflag in 1994 after being asked for his resignation and in 2004 joined the Australian National Flag Association.

In 2015, with the flag debate in New Zealand continuing, discussion on the Australian flag arose in the media. This included the issue being raised publicly by Labor MP Tim Watts.

== Polling ==
Since 1967, various polling companies have surveyed Australians as to whether they believe the flag should be changed, or the Union Jack retained.

=== On conversion to "a new design" ===
Date	Firm	New flag	Retain flag	Undecided	Question asked
June 2025	IPA	10%	75%	15%	(Note: "Australia should retain its current national flag?")
October 2024	Roy Morgan	39%	61%	-	(Note: "Do you think Australia should have a new design for our National Flag or not?")
April 2010	Roy Morgan	29%	66%	5%	(Note: "Do you think Australia should have a new design for our National Flag?")
February 1998	Roy Morgan	52%	44%	4%	(Note: "Do you think Australia should have a new design for our National Flag?")
June 1996	Roy Morgan	36%	56%	8%	(Note: "Do you think Australia should have a new design for our National Flag?")
June 1992	Roy Morgan	39%	57%	4%	(Note: "Do you think Australia should have a new design for our National Flag?")
March 1992	Roy Morgan	42%	52%	6%	(Note: "Do you think Australia should have a new design for our National Flag?")
April 1984	Roy Morgan	39%	55%	6%	(Note: "Do you think Australia should have a new design for our National Flag?")
June 1982	Roy Morgan	32%	63%	5%	(Note: "Do you think Australia should have a new design for our National Flag?")
September 1979	Roy Morgan	27%	63%	10%	(Note: "Do you think Australia should have a new design for our National Flag?")

=== On removal of the Union Jack ===
Date	Firm	Remove Union Jack	Retain Union Jack	Undecided	Question asked
April 2010	Roy Morgan	24%	69%	7%	(Note: "Do you think the Union Jack should continue to be in our flag, or not?")
January 2004	Newspoll	32%	57%	11%	(Note: "Are you personally in favour or against changing the Australian Flag so as to remove the Union Jack Emblem?")
February 1998	Roy Morgan	41%	53%	6%	
June 1996	Roy Morgan	30%	63%	7%	
July 1967	Roy Morgan	17%	72%	11%	
June 1992	Roy Morgan	32%	62%	6%	
March 1992	Roy Morgan	37%	57%	6%	
April 1984	Roy Morgan	28%	66%	6%	
June 1982	Roy Morgan	26%	69%	5%	
September 1979	Roy Morgan	22%	67%	11%	
October 1972	Roy Morgan	26%	60%	14%	

== See also ==
- Flags Act 1953 (Commonwealth of Australia)
- List of Australian flags
- List of proposed Australian flags
- Great Canadian flag debate
- New Zealand flag debate
- Northern Ireland flags issue
