= Timeline of the flag of Australia =

The following is a timeline of the flag of Australia.

- 3 September 1901 – The winning entry in the 1901 Federal Flag Design Competition is announced, and the Australian flag is flown for the first time at the Royal Exhibition Building in Melbourne. In the same week it was also flown at the Melbourne show.
- 16 September 1901 – The Australian flag is formally raised at Townsville, Queensland in the presence of the Governor-General of Australia, John Hope, 7th Earl of Hopetoun
- 1902 – King Edward VII approved the Australian flag design as standardised by the British admiralty.
- 20 February 1903 – The design of the Australian flag appears in the Commonwealth of Australia Gazette.
- 1 July to 23 November 1904 – The Australian flag flies at the Olympic Games in St Louis, Missouri.
- 27 April to 31 October 1908 – The Australian flag is raised at the Olympic games in London in honour of Australia's first gold medal, which was for Rugby Union.
- December 1908 – Australian Army Military Order No 58/08 directs that the "Australian [Blue] Ensign" is to replace the Union Jack at all military establishments (stations).
- 19 December 1908 – The governor-general signs a proclamation increasing the number of points on the Commonwealth Star from six to seven.
- 22 May 1909 – Notice of the alteration in the design of the Australian flag appears in the Commonwealth of Australia Gazette.
- 1911 – The Royal Australian Navy is formed and it is directed that the British White Ensign be flown at the stern and the Australian flag at the jackstaff. In the same year, it was adopted as the saluting flag of the Australian Army at all reviews and ceremonial parades (M.O.135), with the Union Jack being reserved for "all occasions when a representative of His Majesty the King reviews the Commonwealth forces" (M.O.391).
- 25 December 1912 – Frank Wild, part of Sir Douglas Mawson's Australasian Antarctic Expedition 1911–1914, raises the Australian flag upon formally claiming Queen Mary Land (now part of Australian Antarctic Territory) for the Commonwealth of Australia.
- 12 March 1913 – The Australian flag flies for the dedication of Australia's capital city Canberra.
- 6 August 1914 – The Australian flag is associated with an act of war for the first time as it flies over the fort at Queenscliff, Victoria when the artillery battery opens fire to prevent the German steamer SS Pfalz from leaving port. This was the first British Empire shot of the First World War.
- 9 November 1914 – HMAS Sydney flies the Australian flag as a battle ensign from the mainmast during her famous victory over the German warship, SMS Emden, in the Battle of Cocos.
- 20 September 1917 – During the Allied victory in the Battle of Polygon Wood in Belgium, Lieutenant A.V.L. Hull plants the Australian flag on an enemy pillbox. A depiction of this event was subsequently featured on a fundraising postcard.
- 8 August 1918 –During the liberation of France, General William Birdwood dispatched a flag (now on display at the Australian War Memorial) to the 15th Infantry brigade with orders that it be flown at Harbonnières. The commander of the 59th battalion bestowed this honour on the first man to reach the objective, 22-year-old Gallipoli veteran Private Ernest Forty.
- 1928 – Sir Charles Kingsford-Smith takes three Australian flags aboard his aircraft, the Southern Cross, during the first flight to cross the Tasman Sea to New Zealand. These flags were subsequently given to the Sydney Hospital.
- 23 March 1934 – A technical drawing of the Australian flag is published in Commonwealth Government Gazette No 18.
- 15 March 1941 – Prime Minister Robert Menzies issues a media release recommending that the general public flies the predominantly blue Australian flag on land and the Australian Red Ensign at sea.
- 19 February 1942 – A flag flying outside the residence of the Administrator of the Northern Territory becomes the first flag to come under enemy fire on Australian soil during a Japanese air raid.
- November 1942 – The Australian flag is raised as the Allies retake Kokoda in New Guinea.
- 25 November 1943 – Sergeant Tom Derrick hoists the Australian flag from a shell-torn tree at Mount Sattelberg, New Guinea, after his action where he destroyed ten enemy machine-gun posts for which he was awarded the Victoria Cross for valour.
- 12 September 1945 – The first flag to fly at the liberation of Singapore was an Australian flag secretly made in a prisoner of war camp.
- 24 February 1947 – Prime Minister Ben Chifley issues a statement encouraging more general and widespread use of the Australian flag.
- June 1947 – Howard Beale MP writes a letter to flag manufacturers requesting that produce the predominantly blue Australian flag instead of the red ensign (except for use afloat).
- 1951 – The Australian government inaugurates the tradition of presenting the Australian flag to all public schools.
- 2 December 1953 – The Australian parliament passes the Flags Act of 1953. The Australian flag replaces the Union Jack in the number one position in the order of precedence, with its official title being the "Australian National Flag".
- 14 February 1954 – Her Majesty Queen Elizabeth II personally signed the Flags Act (Amended) No 1 of 1954 into law, which was the first occasion that federal legislation was reserved for royal assent by a reigning monarch.
- 1963 – Prime Minister Sir Robert Menzies authorises the permanent flying of the Australian National Flag over the capital, illuminated at night.
- 1 March 1967 – The Australian White Ensign was adopted as the distinguishing flag for the Royal Australian Navy, to be "worn" (flown) in addition to the Australian National Flag.
- 24 March 1981 – The Flags Amendment Act 1981 describes the Australian National Flag as a blue flag consisting of the Southern Cross, Commonwealth Star and Union Jack.
- 3 October 1987 – Five hundred Australian National Flags are flown in honour of Australia's Vietnam War veterans in Sydney, commemorating the number of lives lost.
- 28 August 1996 – The governor-general, Sir William Deane, proclaims 3 September as "Australian National Flag Day" to commemorate the day in 1901 on which the Australian National Flag was first flown.
- 24 March 1998 – Flag Amendment Bill amends the Flags Act 1953 to provide for a popular vote concerning any proposed changes to the Australian National Flag.
- 11 April 2000 – Alec Campbell, the last surviving Gallipoli veteran, hands over an Australian National Flag to a serving member of the Australian Defence Force at a ceremony in Canberra. This flag is flown every year at the annual ANZAC Day ceremony held at ANZAC Cove in Gallipoli, Turkey on 25 April.
- 3 September 2001 – The centenary of the Australian National Flag was commemorated across Australia. Prime Minister John Howard gave a speech at the Royal Exhibition Building at a re-enactment of the first raising of the Australian National Flag. Governor-General, Peter Hollingworth, held a flag-raising ceremony at Government House, Canberra in honour of the occasion.
- 20 September 2001 – The governor-general signs the Centenary Flag Warrant. It is an Australian National Flag made of satin and inscribed with a special message and was intended to be used at important national events in the future. It features an embellishment representing the linkage between past, current, and future Australians.

== See also ==
- Flags Act 1953

== Bibliography ==
- Australian Flags (3rd ed.). Canberra: Australian Government Publishing Service. 2006. ISBN 0-642-47134-7.
- Cayley, Frank (1966). Flag of Stars. Adelaide: Rigby. ISBN 978-9-04-010451-0.
- Goodman, Rupert (1998). Don't change our flag: An exposure of false and misleading arguments. Tingalpa: Boolorong Press.
- Kwan, Elizabeth (2006). Flag and Nation: Australians and their National Flags since 1901. Sydney: University of New South Wales. ISBN 0-86840-567-1.
- Maitland, Gordon (2015). The story of Australia's flags: Our flags, standards, guidons, colours, banners, battle honours and ensigns. Pymble: Playbill Printworks. ISBN 9780992515416.
- Odgers, George (1989). Navy Australia: An Illustrated History. Frenchs Forest: Child and Associates.
