= Australian Flag Society =

Lobby group

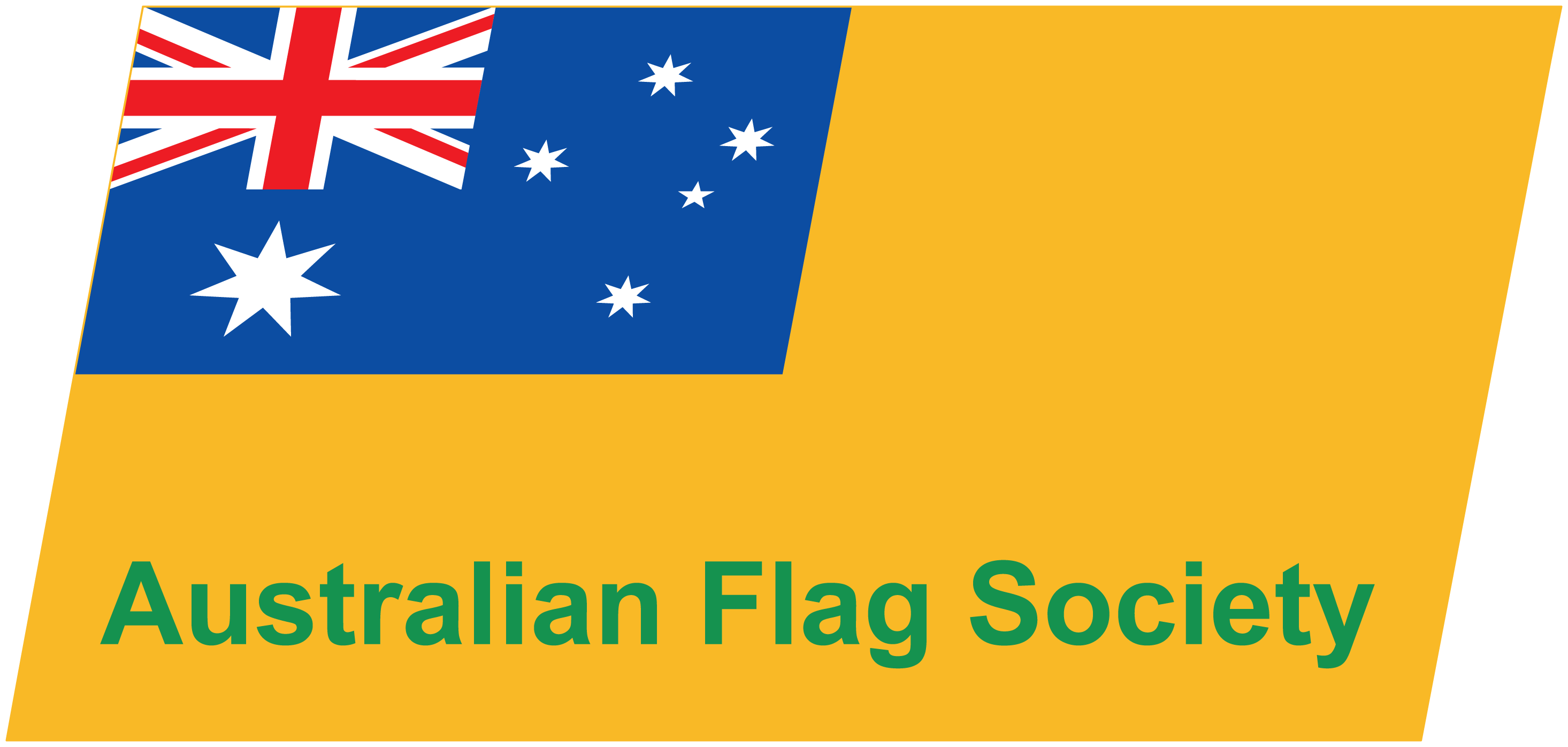
- National Convenor: Nigel Morris
- Founded: 4 July 2001 [As Australian National Flag Association (ACT) Inc]
- Ideology: Christian nationalism National conservatism Edwardian militarism
- Slogan: "Fear God, Honour the Queen, Remember 1915!" "Re-Christianise, Re-Monarchise, Re-Militarise!"

The Australian Flag Society (AFS) is an advocacy group that opposes changing the existing flag of Australia and seeks its constitutional recognition.

== Structure ==
The AFS was originally constituted as the Australian Capital Territory branch of the Australian National Flag Association (ANFA). ANFA ACT was founded by Nigel Morris, who in 2002 secured federal funding for the distribution of the "Our National Flag ... since 1901" video kit to all primary schools in Australia and was described as a "flag lobbyist" by the Canberra Times. However, on 15 July 2003, affiliation with ANFA was severed, and the organisation rebranded.

== Campaigns and initiatives ==
=== Parliament house centenary flag ===
On 18 September 2001, during the centenary of federation, the federal member for Hinkler, Paul Neville, requested of the speaker that:

before it [the flag] becomes too faded or too tattered, [it] be taken down and perhaps offered to a museum or an art gallery as the seminal flag that flew over this building 100 years from the time the first flag was flown?

The parliament house centenary flag was subsequently entrusted to the AFS and has been paraded at schools to mark Australian National Flag Day on a tour of the Australian Capital Territory, New South Wales and Queensland.

=== Civics education ===
The AFS has proposed that 22 August be proclaimed as "Captain Cook Day" to commemorate the date explorer James Cook declared the British claim to Australia.

=== National language, holiday and flag bill ===
On 30 April 2009 the AFS released their National Language, Holiday and Flag Bill, as the way forward in response to a petition of certain citizens calling for a parliamentary committee to review the Flags Act 1953 (Cth). It proposed amending the Australian Constitution to declare English the national language, 26 January to be Australia Day and to retain the existing flag as the national flag.

Under the proposed legislative and constitutional refinements, it is envisaged that the Flags Act would remain on the statute books to provide the construction sheet for the Australian National Flag, which would be described in terms of its essential elements in the constitution, thereby settling the question of popular sovereignty in relation to the process for reviewing the design – in whole or in part – with a weighty body of legal opinion against the constitutionality of the current statutory rules in subsections 3(2) and (3), which provide for an instant-runoff for choosing between the existing flag and one or more alternatives, on the basis of universal suffrage. As the device occupying the lower hoist is simply referred to as a "large white Commonwealth Star", the number of points on what is a well-recognised heraldic symbol in its own right could be varied by ordinary legislation, according to changes in membership of the Australian Federation, and not by a plebiscite as currently required, which would remove what has been criticised as an "anomalous and costly" impediment.

=== Opposition to the recognition of other flags ===
In the lead up to the sesquicentenary of the Eureka Stockade in 2004, the AFS opposed moves to have the Eureka Flag officially recognised under the Flags Act 1953 (Cth).

In 2008, the AFS lobbied members of the Tasmanian parliament for a public inquiry to be held in response to a motion proposed by Denison Labor MHA Lisa Singh to have the Australian Aboriginal flag stand in Parliament House, Hobart. The AFS is also opposed to "aboriginal treaties, separate elected and constitutional representation".

=== National treasure quests ===
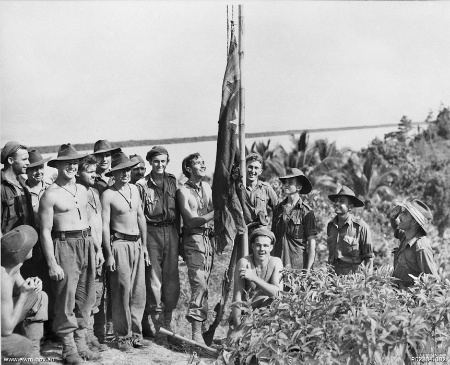
The Australian flag as raised at Lingkas beach, Tarakan on 1 May 1945, was subsequently discovered in 2018 by the AFS in Ipswich, Queensland.

In 2013 the AFS announced a worldwide quest and $10,000 reward for information leading to the discovery of the Union Jack that was reportedly hoisted as a second flag at the battle of the Eureka Stockade.

An Australian flag belonging to the 2nd/23rd battalion and flown at Lingkas beach during the battle of Tarakan was discovered after being featured on the promotional logo for the society's proposed Annual Pause for the National Salute. The frayed specimen contains the inscriptions "2nd/23rd", "26th Brig", "Tarakan", "Oboe" and "May 1945" made using a substance "believed to be human blood".

In 2024, it was reported in the Corryong Courier that the AFS had discovered an Australian Red Ensign bearing the words "Changi '41 '42" and "Chitty flag", which may have flown over the Changi AFL game where prisoner of war Peter Chitty won the "Changi brownlow medal" that is on display at the Australian War Memorial. Also found were a leather football and whistle with the inscription "Changi Football League", along with a basketball bearing the words "Changi Basketball League".

=== National salute ===
The AFS has proposed that all schools in Australia pause to recite the words of the national salute as part of the annual Australian National Flag Day commemorations. The national salute was part of Australian school tradition until falling into disuse from the late 1950s. The version used by the AFS reads as follows:

I fear God,
I love my country,
I honour her Queen,
I salute her flag,
I promise to always obey her laws.

== Publications ==
Flag Breaking News is an occasional news bulletin published by the Australian Flag Society.

== See also ==
- Australian flag debate
- List of proposed Australian flags
- Ausflag
