= List of proposed Australian flags =

Alternatives to the current banner

This is a list comprising flags proposed as alternatives to the current flag of Australia, which have received media coverage.

== National flags ==
| Flag | Date | Name | Designer | Design | Notes |
|---|---|---|---|---|---|
| | 1830s | Australian Federation Flag | Captain Jacob Gronow | A white field defaced with a blue symmetric cross featuring 5 stars depicting the Crux Australis. A Union Jack sits in the canton. | Also known as the New South Wales Ensign. Used as a symbol during political agitation for Federation. |
| | 1854 | Eureka Flag | "Lieutenant" Henry Ross | The battle flag of the Eureka Stockade featured the five stars of the constellation Crux Australis in white on a white cross and blue field. | |
| | 1900 | Melbourne Evening Herald Flag (Blue) | Mr. F. Thompson of Melbourne | The six red stripes represent the six Australian states. | Won Melbourne Evening Herald contest in 1900. |
| | 1901 | | A. Downer | First use of Commonwealth Star | |
| | 1902 | British Empire flag (Australian) | C. D. Bennet | A design reported in the Daily Express to have been proposed as part of a series of flags that aimed to replace the Union Jack in individual regions of the British Empire. Each locality, including Australia, would have been granted the top right quarter to place a national symbol. | |
| | 1956 | | | The Blue Ensign with Union Jack in the canton removed. The Commonwealth Star is enlarged and moves from the hoist to the canton. | Proposed by the Republican Socialist League. One of the earliest proposals for a redesign to remove the Union Jack. |
| | 1982 | | Ralph Kelly | A blue field with the Commonwealth Star and the Southern Cross separated by a yellow boomerang. | A weekly finalist in the Daily Telegraph flag design competition |
| | 1992 | | John Bartholomew | A stylised golden kangaroo on a green field with the Southern Cross in the canton. | Winning design in Adelaide Advertiser flag competition |
| | 1993 | | David Couzens | A vertical tricolour of black, gold and green with the Southern Cross in the black band. | Joint winning design in A Current Affair's flag competition |
| | 2013 | Reconciliation Flag | Dr John C. Blaxland | Many dots on a large star with a red boomerang separating the Indigenous and European populations that have influenced the country. | |
| | 2014 | Southern Horizon Flag | Brett Moxey | Green and gold on the lower side, reflecting sand and grass, as well as Australian national colors. Commonwealth Star and Southern Cross on top. | |
| | 2015 | Golden Wattle Flag | Jeremy Matthews | A single stylised golden wattle emblem, centred on a green background. The emblem represents seven wattle blossoms arranged in a circle to create the Commonwealth Star in the centre. | |

== Sporting flags ==
| Flag | Date | Use | Description |
|---|---|---|---|
| | 2013 | Proposed Australian sporting flag (from Ausflag) | The Southern Cross on a blue field with two vertical bands (green and gold) on the left edge. |

== See also ==
- Australian flag debate
- List of Australian flags
- List of proposed New Zealand flags
