= Australasian Anti-Transportation League =

1840s-1852 Australian organization

- Flag adopted by the Anti-Transportation League
- Region served: South Eastern Australia and New Zealand

The Australasian Anti-Transportation League was an organisation that opposed penal transportation to Australia. It was established in Van Diemen's Land (present-day Tasmania) in the late 1840s, and expanded rapidly with branches in Adelaide, Melbourne, Sydney in Australia, and Canterbury in New Zealand. The Colonial Office abolished transportation to eastern Australia in 1852.

== Development ==
Penal transportation to the Colony of New South Wales (a colony covering the eastern Australian mainland in modern New South Wales, Victoria and Queensland) had ceased in 1840, and the number transported to Van Diemen's Land increased sharply. A two-year suspension of the transportation of male convicts to Van Diemen's Land was implemented in May 1846. It was the intention to resume transportation under new arrangements but that decision was conveyed to the Lieutenant Governor William Denison in the following terms: "it is not the intention that transportation should be resumed at the expiration of the two years"; the words "under the present system" were omitted. The dispatch, taken to mean what it said on its face, was made public before the imperial authorities corrected their error.

By 1851, it had developed into the Australasian League for the Abolition of Transportation with branches on the mainland and New Zealand. In Van Diemen's Land's first partially elective Legislative Council, its supporters won all 16 seats up for election. The Legislative Council subsequently voted 16 to 4 to request Queen Victoria to revoke the Order in Council permitting transportation to Van Diemen's Land and Norfolk Island in spite of the strong opposition of Denison.

The Victorian gold rush, also commencing in 1851, led the Colonial Office to discontinue penal transportation anyway, because it was seen as an incentive for criminals to be transported to eastern Australia. Transportation was abolished in 1852 and the last convict ship to be sent from England, the St Vincent, arrived in Van Diemen's Land in 1853.

== Flag ==
The League had its own flag, the Union Jack with the Southern Cross which was created before 1851 by John West, a Launceston congregational minister, author and newspaper editor.
