= Wentworth–Bland flag =

Campaign banner used by William Wentworth and William Bland

Wentworth–Bland banner
- Digital reproduction of the flag
- Adopted: 1843
- Design: White field with a Union Jack in the canton, two stars and text

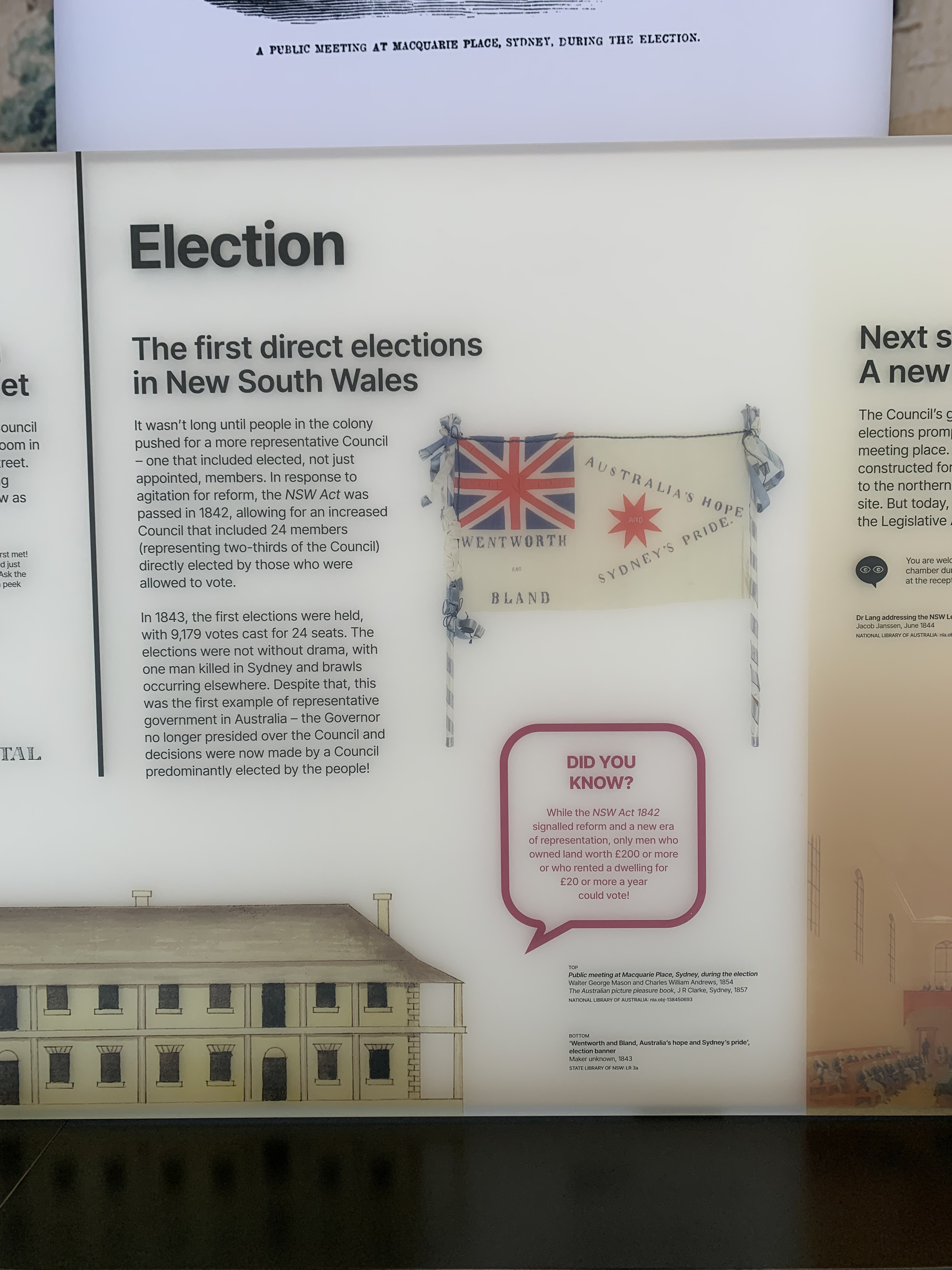
Temporary display featuring the banner at Parliament House, Sydney

An electoral banner was used by William Charles Wentworth and William Bland as joint candidates in the first New South Wales Legislative Council election in 1843. The banner is notable for its role in early Australian electoral democracy and its links to subsequent Australian flags.

== Background ==
William Charles Wentworth was an Australian statesman and politician who became one of the wealthiest and most powerful figures in colonial New South Wales. Wentworth advocated for the rights of emancipists and for representative self-government, professing ideals of free emigration, trial by jury and elected representation.

William Bland was a prominent public figure in the colony of New South Wales, aligning himself with other emancipists and supporting Wentworth's calls for trial by jury, representative government and expanded civil rights for ex-convicts.

The Australian Patriotic Association was formed in 1835 at a meeting chaired by Wentworth. It was led by a group of influential colonists in New South Wales and had among its leaders Wentworth and Bland, and sought representative government. The organisation disbanded following the granting of self-government to New South Wales. Wentworth and Bland who were subsequently elected to the New South Wales Legislative Council for the Town of Sydney electoral district.

== Use ==
The flag was used for Australia's first de facto national election in 1843. Wentworth and Bland campaigned using the embroidered silk banner featuring the slogan "Australia’s Hope and Sydney’s Pride". Supporters of the two candidates paraded behind the banners which were flown from blue-and-white poles.

The election was marked by rioting in Sydney which resulted in one fatality. The worst violence was in the vicinity of the Rocks and Millers Point, with supporters of opposing candidates Maurice Charles O'Connell and Robert Cooper storming the polling booth, during which they pulled down the flags of Wentworth and Bland.

The Australasian Chronicle described this violence thus:

The most serious part of the rioting, however, was in Gipps Ward, where it was commenced by a large party of the O'Connell and Cooperites, preceded by green banners (some of which, belonging to Cooper's party, were surmounted by loaves), and armed with sticks, palings, and such other weapons of a similar nature as could be gathered on the instant, this riotous body demolished in an instant the flags of Messrs. Wentworth and Bland, and the tables and chairs of their poll clerks.

== Legacy ==
The flag's design, featuring a Union Jack in the canton and another arrangement in the fly, was a precursor to subsequent British colonial flags in Australia. Wentworth biographer Andrew Tink writes that the flags "were the earliest banners to bear any resemblance to the modern Australian flag."

== See also ==
- National Colonial Flag
- Australian Federation Flag
