= Flag debate =

Flag debate or Great flag debate may refer to:

- Australian flag debate, a debate over whether the Australian flag should be changed in order to remove the Union Flag from the canton.
- Great Canadian Flag Debate, which took place in 1964 when a new design for the national flag of Canada was chosen.
- New Zealand flag debate, a debate over whether the New Zealand flag should be changed in order to remove the Union Flag from the canton.

== See also ==
- Confederate flag controversy
- Northern Ireland flags issue
- US Flag Desecration Amendment
