= Australian Patriotic Association =

Political party in the colony of New South Wales, Australia

- Founder: William Wentworth
- Founded: 1835
- Dissolved: 1842
- Headquarters: Sydney

Electoral flag used by William Wentworth and William Bland, former members of the Australian Patriotic Association

The Australian Patriotic Association was the first political party in Australia. Founded in Sydney in 1835, this coalition of emancipists (former convicts) and liberals formed to campaign for the total civil and political rights of colonists. Their platform focused on two radical structural changes: ending restrictions on how juries operated and replacing the appointed Legislative Council with a fully elected Assembly. Its primary objective was to ensure that ex-convicts faced no legal barriers to serving as jurors, voting, or holding office—a direct challenge to the "exclusive" free settlers who sought to permanently disenfranchise them. Its leadership included William Wentworth, the son of a convict woman and the publisher of the influential newspaper the Australian; Sir John Jamison, a surgeon and founder of the Agricultural Society; and William Bland, a prominent emancipist doctor. Members included prominent businessman Prosper de Mestre, Samuel Terry, W.E. Riley, J. Blaxland and A.B. Spark.

In September 1834 Sir Edward Lytton Bulwer, M.P., wrote from England that the situation in the colony was not well understood in London, and suggested that an organised association should be formed, and that it should appoint a parliamentary agent for New South Wales. This resulted in the formation of the Association in 1835 by Wentworth. Bland was its "chairman of the committee of correspondence" (i.e.: Secretary). The Association sought representative government for the colony with a broad franchise, and was opposed by more conservative free settlers in the colony who, while favouring representative government, sought disenfranchisement of emancipists.

The Association had representatives in England to put their case before the British government, which was then considering a new constitution for New South Wales. Bulwer acted as parliamentary agent until 1838, when he was succeeded by Charles Buller. A petition went forward to the British government in 1839. During 1839–1841, Bland wrote letters for the Association which show the constitutional struggles towards autonomy. Bland, as secretary, helped draft two bills for a "representative constitution", which contributed to the drafting of the New South Wales Constitution Act, 1842 (UK) with Bland representing Sydney at its reading and approval passages.

The Association also supported the incorporation of the City of Sydney as a municipality with a broad franchise, which happened in July 1842 with a broadly based franchise. The colony's 1842 constitution gave to emancipists the same political rights as free settlers, but which was subject to a property test. The right to vote was limited to men with a freehold valued at £200 or a householder paying rent of £20 per year, both very large sums at the time. With its goals partly achieved, the Association disbanded in 1842. The first election under the new constitution took place in 1843, with several of the members of the now-disbanded Association standing, including Wentworth and Bland elected to the New South Wales Legislative Council.
