= Australian National Flag Association =

The Australian National Flag Association (ANFA) is an organisation that promotes the use of the current Australian National Flag and opposes any changes to it. ANFA was formed at a public meeting held in Sydney on 5 October 1983 to oppose suggestions that the existing Australian National Flag is not appropriately representative of the nation, and should be changed, with Sir Colin Hines elected as founding president of the New South Wales branch.

== Structure ==
There are also autonomous, state-based incorporated associations still operating as ANFA chapters in Queensland, Victoria, Tasmania and Western Australia. There have been informal meetings between the various state presidents where a national spokesperson for the five separate organisations is appointed.

In 2013 an Australian Flag Association was formed, with ANFA Queensland President Allan Pidgeon AM as chair.

=== New South Wales ===
According to their official website ANFA NSW is a non-political, non-sectarian voluntary community service organisation. The controlling Council of Management is elected at each Annual General Meeting, operating under a government approved constitution. The stated aims and objectives are:

- To communicate positively to all Australians the importance and significance of our chief national symbol - the Australian National Flag.
- To provide promotional and educational material concerning the Australian National Flag.
- To promote the Australian identity overseas by the use of the Australian National Flag.
- To support existing "fly the flag" programmes and encourage support from recognised service organisations.
- To encourage personal identity with the Australian National Flag at all levels within the community.

Amongst other activities ANFA NSW has successfully proposed that 3 September be proclaimed as Australian National Flag Day and holds annual commemorations along with other state branches. ANFA NSW produced a video "Our National Flag … since 1901" which tells the story of the flag. This was presented to every Australian school as part of the 'Discovering Democracy' programme.

=== Queensland ===
In 2017 ANFA QLD announced a search for the very first Australian flag, which has been lost since it flew on 3 September 1901 at the Royal Exhibition Building in Melbourne.

=== Western Australia ===
In 1999 ANFA WA erected a memorial on the grave of Mrs Annie Dorrington, who along with four others shared and the prize money in the 1901 Federal Flag Design Competition, with other ANFA state branches contributing towards the costs.

=== Australian Capital Territory ===
The most recent ANFA branch was incorporated in the Australian Capital Territory on 4 July 2001. However, on 15 July 2003, affiliation with ANFA was severed, and the organisation rebranded as the Australian Flag Society. In an interview with the Canberra Times the ANFA ACT spokesperson Nigel Morris was quoted as saying: "I don't have much hope for the future of ANFA the average age of the members is about eighty."

== See also ==
- Ausflag
- Australian flag debate
- Australian Flag Society
- Australian Republic Movement
