= Australasian Anti-Transportation League Flag =

Australian Anti-Transportation League Flag

The Australian Anti-Transportation League Flag is a flag used historically by members of the Australasian Anti-Transportation League who opposed penal transportation to the British colonies that are now a part of Australia, which was to become Australia's first major movement arguing for national self-determination. It is particularly significant as it is the oldest known flag to feature a representation of the Southern Cross with the stars arranged as they are seen in the sky.

The flag was designed in 1849 by Reverend John West of Launceston, Tasmania, and from 1 February 1851, when the Australasian League begin its operations, it was used in the Australian colonies and in New Zealand. The flag is based on the Blue Ensign – blue background with the Union Flag in the canton – and has gold or yellow stars of the Southern Cross on the fly. Each of the stars of the Southern Cross was symbolic of a member colony. There is a white border around three sides of the flag, which was used to display the name of the League, the year it was established and the name of the colony where it was flown.

The flag was no longer used after transportation was ceased in 1853; however, the design of the flag is similar to several later flags, including the Flag of New Zealand, Flag of Victoria, and Flag of Australia.

== See also ==
- List of Australian flags
