= St Vincent (1829) =

Australian convict ship

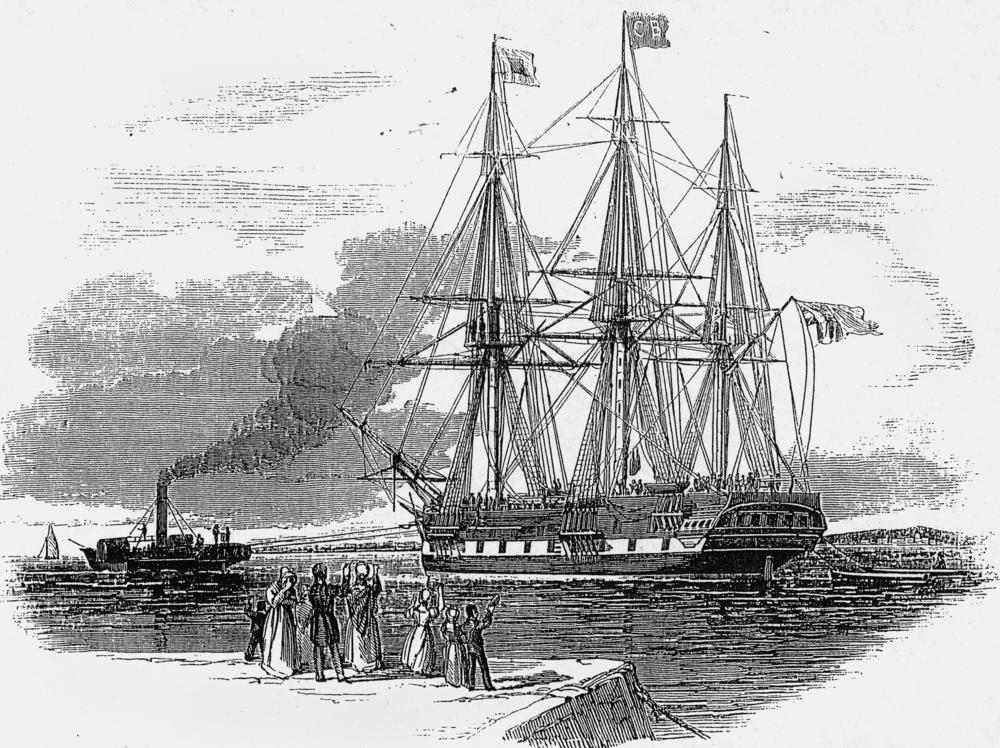
- The St Vincent departing Deptford, England on the 11 April 1844, for Plymouth and Cork, arriving at Botany Bay, Sydney on 31 July 1844

History

United Kingdom
- Name: St Vincent
- Builder: London
- Launched: 1829
- In service: Till at least 1863
- Fate: Unknown

General characteristics
- Sail plan: Full-rigged ship

The Saint Vincent sailed on the Australia Run, carrying emigrants or convicts on several voyages, each lasting three to four months duration, between 1836 and 1853. She was the last ship to transport convicts to Tasmania.

== Career ==
St. Vincent was built and launched in London in 1829, for her owners Cruickshank and Co.

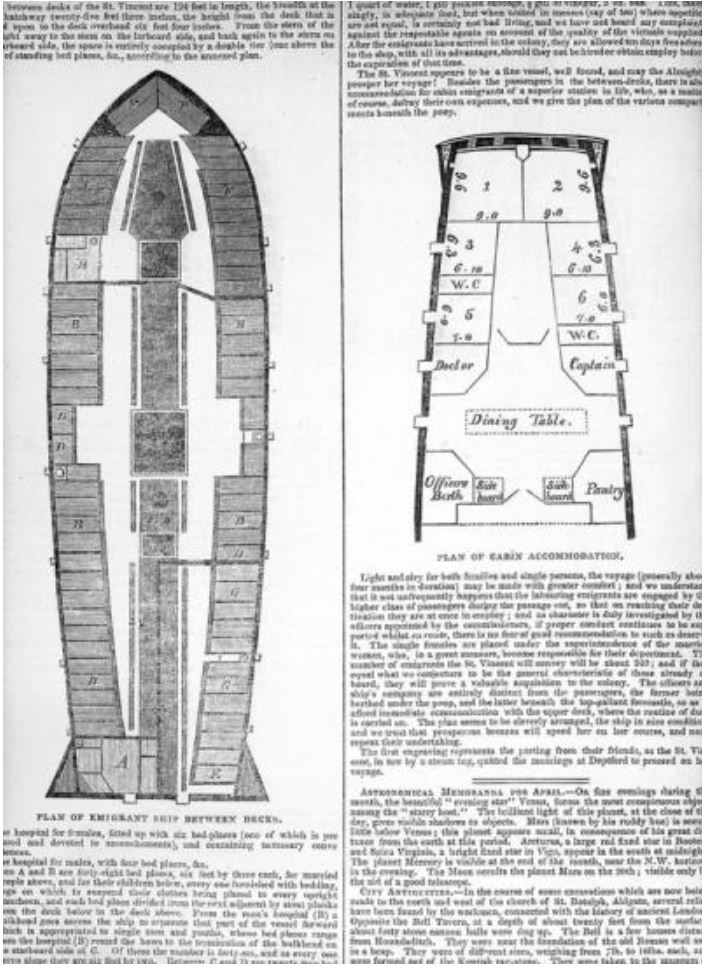
A plan of the St Vincent in 1844

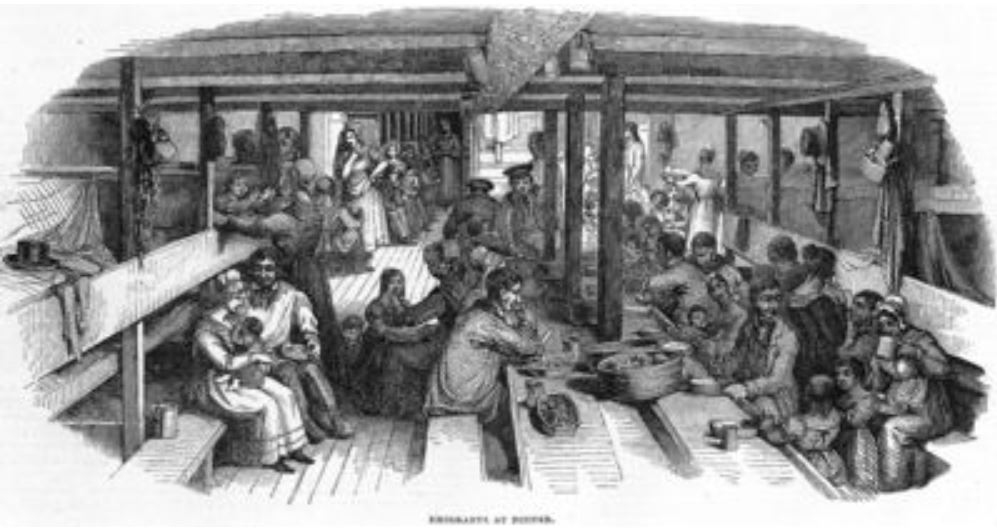
Below deck on the St Vincent in 1844

Her Australian career began as a convict ship in a voyage to Sydney in 1837. She then served as an emigrant ship making voyages to Sydney in 1840, 1841. Originally built as 410 tons she was lengthened in 1844, and remeasured as 497 tons o.m. / 630 tons n.m. On 8 April 1844 In 1844 she sailed from Deptford with 165 emigrants on board, bound for Sydney. Only stopping in the West Country at Plymouth, and Cork, Ireland (then known as Queenstown while under British rule) where she took on additional migrants. Most emigrants were in receipt of special government grants designed to subsidise settlement in the colonies. Successful candidates were families, single men 'of good character' and a smaller number of single women aged between eighteen and thirty, who had been in domestic or farm service. The Illustrated London News reported on 13 April 1844 that “The future well being and respectability of the colony [Australia] mainly depends on the good conduct of the working classes”. In again transported emigrants to Sydney in 1844 and 1849 and then acted again as a convict ship in two voyages to Hobart in 1850 and 1853, she was the last ship to transport convicts to Tasmania.

As of 1863 she was reported as being still afloat.

== Convict transportation ==
| Embarked | Date | Disembarked | Date | Passengers | Notes |
|---|---|---|---|---|---|
| England | 13 September 1836 | Sydney, New South Wales | 5 January 1837 | 4 | Avg. sentence: 7 years. Life sentences: 3 |
| England | 13 December 1849 | Hobart, Van Diemen's Land | 4 April 1850 | 207 | Avg. sentence: 8 years. Life sentences: 2 |
| England | 28 December 1852 | Hobart, Van Diemen's Land | 26 May 1853 | 214 | Avg. sentence: 10 years. Life sentences: 0 |
