= Flag of Australia =

Commonwealth of Australia
- Australian Blue Ensign
- Use: National flag and state ensign
- Proportion: 1∶2
- Adopted: 11 February 1903; 123 years ago; 8 December 1908; 117 years ago (current seven-pointed Commonwealth Star version); 8 April 1954; 72 years ago (designated as the Australian National Flag and given precedence over the Union Jack)
- Design: A Blue Ensign defaced with the Commonwealth Star in the lower hoist quarter and the five stars of the Southern Cross in the fly half.
- Designed by: Annie Dorrington, Ivor Evans, Lesley Hawkins, Egbert Nutall and William Stevens

The national flag of Australia is based on the British Blue Ensign—a blue field with the Union Jack in the upper hoist quarter—featuring a large white seven-pointed star (the Commonwealth Star) and a representation of the Southern Cross constellation, made up of five white stars (one small five-pointed star and four larger seven-pointed stars).

The original version of the flag first flew as the Commonwealth blue ensign on 3 September 1901, after being selected alongside a merchant naval red ensign in a competition held following federation. A slightly simplified version as approved by King Edward VII was officially adopted in 1903. It was later modified to the current design on 8 December 1908, with the change from a six to a seven-point Commonwealth Star.

Initially restricted to government and shipping use, the blue ensign slowly gained prominence as a popular Australian symbol alongside the red ensign, which had less restrictions on its use. At first, the flag remained officially subordinate to the Union Jack, and solely flying the blue ensign could be seen as expressing disloyalty to the British Empire. By 1954, however, in line with Australia's increasing independence from the United Kingdom, the blue ensign was designated as the Australian National Flag with the passage of the Flags Act 1953. The act also gave the Australian flag precedence over the Union Jack for the first time. Over time, usage of the Union Jack decreased, with most Australians considering the blue ensign the national flag by the 1970s.

Australia also has a number of other official flags representing its states and territories, indigenous peoples and government bodies.

== Design ==
=== Devices ===
The Australian flag uses three prominent symbols: the Union Jack, Southern Cross, and Commonwealth Star.

==== Union Jack ====
Adopted in its current form in 1801, the Union Jack incorporates three heraldic crosses representing the nations of the United Kingdom of Great Britain and Ireland as they were constituted at the time:

- The red St George's Cross of England
- The white diagonal St Andrew's Cross of Scotland
- The red diagonal St Patrick's Cross of Ireland

Located in the canton, the position of honour in the flag, the Union Jack acknowledges the history of British settlement in Australia. Further, the British Admiralty required a flag based on the Blue or Red Ensign for maritime use.

==== Commonwealth Star ====
The Commonwealth Star, also known as the Federation Star, is located in the lower hoist quarter. It originally had six points, representing the six federating colonies. In 1908, a seventh point was added to symbolise the Territory of Papua, and any future territories. The Commonwealth Star does not have any official relation to Beta Centauri, despite the latter's brightness and location in the sky; however, the 1870 version of the flag of South Australia featured the pointer stars, Alpha and Beta Centauri.

==== Southern Cross ====
The Southern Cross is located in the fly half of the flag. It is one of the most distinctive constellations visible in the Southern Hemisphere, and has been used to represent Australia since the early days of British settlement. Ivor Evans, one of the flag's designers, intended the Southern Cross to also refer to the four moral virtues ascribed to the four main stars by Dante: justice, prudence, temperance and fortitude. The number of points on the stars of the Southern Cross on the modern Australian flag differs from the original competition-winning design, in which they ranged between five and nine points each, representing their relative brightness in the night sky. The stars are named after the first five letters of the Greek alphabet, in decreasing order of brightness in the sky. Alpha was originally larger than Beta and Gamma whilst Delta was originally smaller than Beta and Gamma. In order to simplify manufacture, the British Admiralty standardised the size and shape of the four larger outer stars at seven points and each of the same size, leaving the smaller, more central star with five points. This change was officially gazetted on 23 February 1903.

=== Colours ===
The colours of the flag, although not specified by the Flags Act, have been given Pantone specifications by the Parliamentary and Government Branch of the Department of the Prime Minister and Cabinet. The Australian Government's Style Manual for Authors, Editors and Printers also gives CMYK and RGB specifications for depicting the flag in print and on screen respectively.

Scheme				Source(s)
Pantone	280 C	185 C		
RGB (Hex)	0–27–105 (#001B69)	229–0-39 (#E50027)	255–255–255 (#FFFFFF)	
CMYK	100%–74%–0%–59%	0%–100%–83%–10%	0%–0%–0%–0%	

The shade of the red colour in the canton of the Australian flag (Pantone 185C, Hex: #FF0000) is actually generally lighter than the shade used (no specific shade is specified) in the British flag (Pantone 186C, Hex: #C8102E) from which it originated. The blue colour has a different hex code for RGB scheme, but when printed -the Pantone number- it is the same: Australia (Pantone 280C, Hex: 00008B) vs. United Kingdom (Pantone 280C, Hex: 012169). The flag is represented as the Unicode emoji sequence U+1F1E6 🇦 REGIONAL INDICATOR SYMBOL LETTER A, U+1F1FA 🇺 REGIONAL INDICATOR SYMBOL LETTER U.

== Construction ==
Construction sheet for the flag of Australia. The length of the flag is twice the width.

Constituent parts of the flag of Australia

Flags forming the Union Jack

Southern Cross

Commonwealth Star

Under the Flags Act, the Australian National Flag must meet the following specifications:

- the Union Jack occupying the upper quarter (canton) next to the staff;
- a large seven-pointed white star (six representing the six states of Australia and one representing the territories) in the centre of the lower quarter next to the staff and pointing direct to the centre of St George's Cross in the Union Jack;
- five white stars (representing the Southern Cross) in the half of the flag further from the staff.

The location of the stars is as follows:

- Commonwealth Star – 7-pointed star, centred in lower hoist.
- Alpha Crucis – 7-pointed star, straight below centre fly 1/6 up from bottom edge.
- Beta Crucis – 7-pointed star, 1/4 of the way left and 1/16 up from the centre fly.
- Gamma Crucis – 7-pointed star, straight above centre fly 1/6 down from top edge.
- Delta Crucis – 7-pointed star, 2/9 of the way right and 31/240 up from the centre fly.
- Epsilon Crucis – 5-pointed star, 1/10 of the way right and 1/24 down from the centre fly.

The outer diameter of the Commonwealth Star is 3/10 of the flag's width, while that of the stars in the Southern Cross is 1/7 of the flag's width, except for Epsilon, for which the fraction is 1/12. Each star's inner diameter is 4/9 of the outer diameter. The flag's width is the measurement of the hoist edge of the flag (the distance from top to bottom).

== Protocol ==
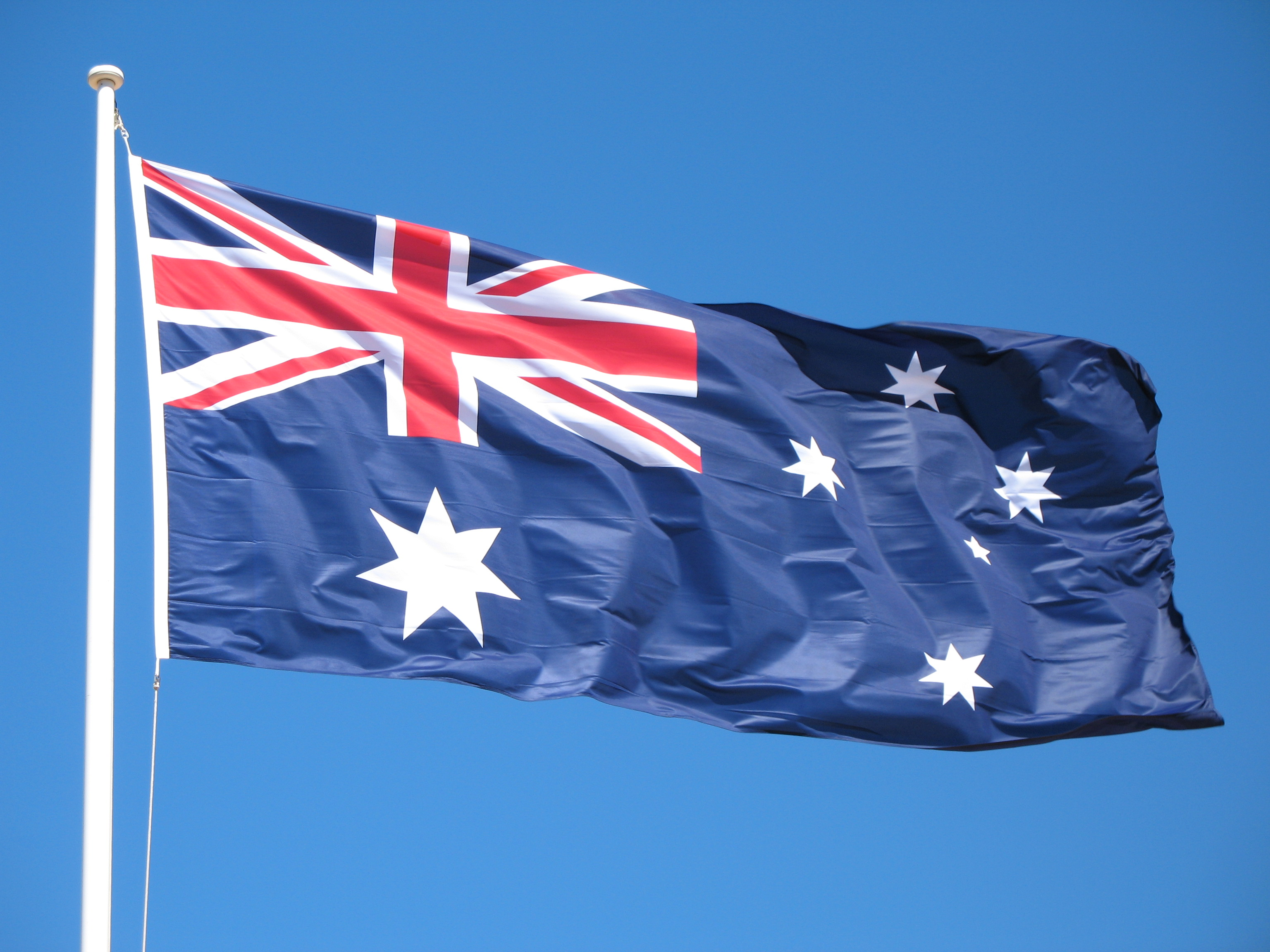
The flag flying

Guidelines for flying the flag are laid out in the pamphlet "Australian Flags", which is infrequently published by the Australian Government. The guidelines say that the Australian National Flag is allowed to be flown on every day of the year, and that it "should be treated with the respect and dignity it deserves as the nation's most important national symbol".

The National Flag must always be flown in a position superior to that of any other flag or ensign when flown in Australia or on Australian territory, and it should always be flown aloft and free. The flag must be flown in all government buildings and (where possible) displayed in or near polling stations when there is a national election or referendum. Government ships, fishing vessels, pleasure craft, small craft and commercial vessels under 24 metres in tonnage length, can fly either the Red Ensign or the Australian National Flag, but not both. The British Blue Ensign can be flown on an Australian owned ship instead of the Australian flag if the owner has a warrant valid under British law.

The Department of the Prime Minister and Cabinet also advises that the flag should only be flown during daylight hours, unless it is illuminated. Two flags should not be flown from the same flagpole. The flag should not be displayed upside down under any circumstances, not even to express a situation of distress. The flag is not to be placed or dropped on the ground, nor should it be used to cover an object in the lead-up to an unveiling ceremony, or to hide other material. Flags that have decayed or faded should not be displayed. Old or decayed flags should be disposed of in private "in a dignified way"; a method given as an example is to cut the flag into small pieces before being placed in the waste.

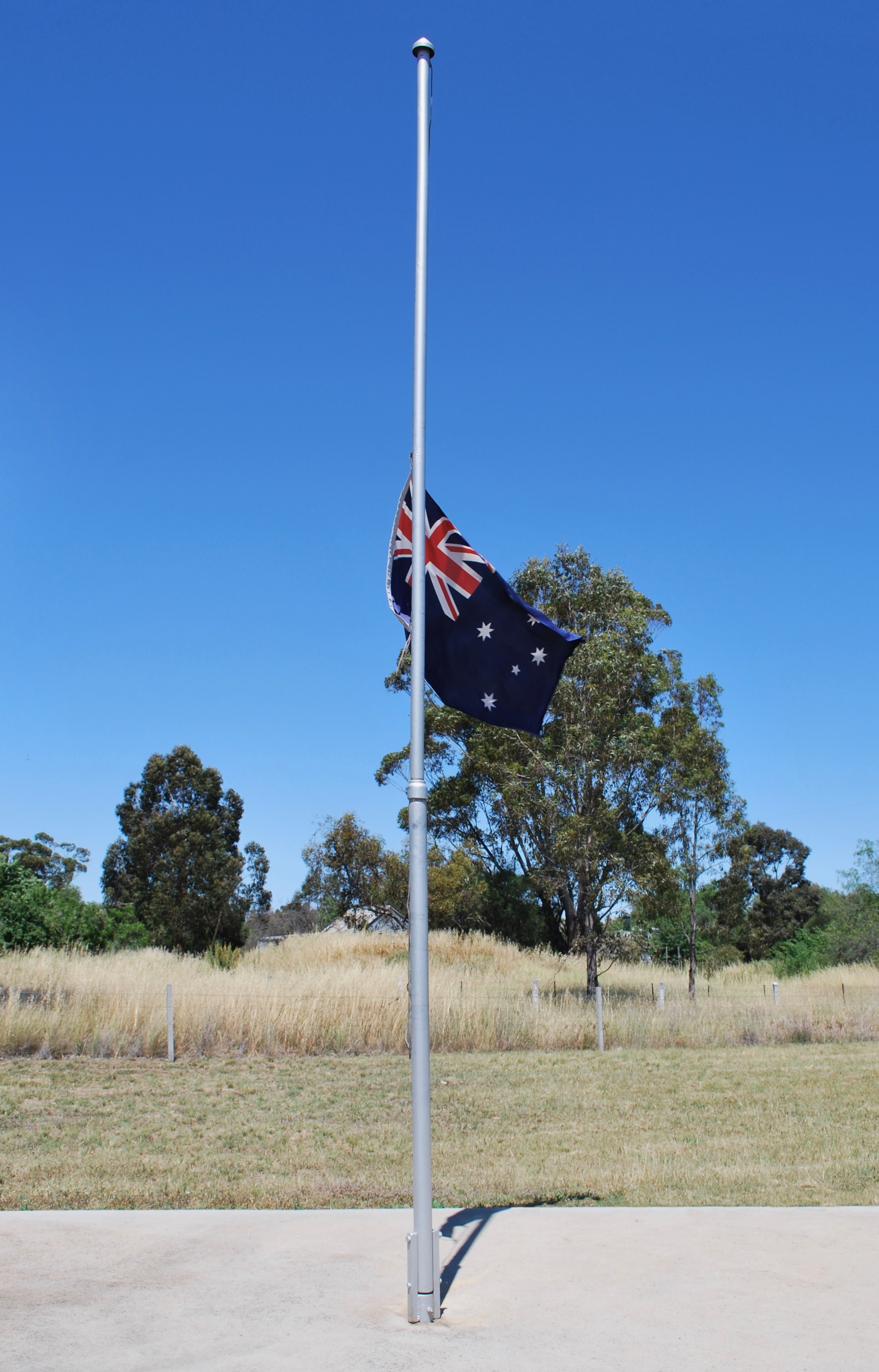
Australian flag at half-mast on Remembrance Day

When the flag is flown at half-mast, it should be recognisably at half-mast—for example, a third of the way down from the top of the pole. The Australian flag should never be flown half mast at night, unless directed to half-mast for an extended period. Days on which flags are flown at half-mast on government buildings include,

- On the death of the sovereign – from the time of announcement of the death up to and including the funeral. On the day the accession of the new sovereign is proclaimed, it is customary to raise the flag to the top of the mast from 11 am.
- On the death of a member of the royal family by special command of the Sovereign and/or by direction of the Australian Government.
- On the death of the governor-general or a former governor-general.
- On the death of a distinguished Australian citizen in accordance with protocol. Flags in any locality may be flown at half-mast on the death of a notable local citizen or on the day, or part of the day, of their funeral.
- On the death of the head of state of another country with which Australia has diplomatic relations – the flag would be flown at half-mast on the day of the funeral.
- On ANZAC Day the flag is flown at half-mast until noon.
- On Remembrance Day flags are flown at peak until 10:30 am, at half-mast from 10:30 am to 11:02 am, then at peak for the remainder of the day.

The department provides an email service called the Commonwealth Flag Network, which gives information on national occasions to fly the flag at half-mast as well as national days of commemoration and celebration of the flag.

The Australian National Flag may be used for commercial or advertising purposes without formal permission as long as the flag is used in a dignified manner and reproduced completely and accurately; it should not be defaced by overprinting with words or illustrations, it should not be covered by other objects in displays, and all symbolic parts of the flag should be identifiable. It also must sit first (typically, left) where more than one flag is used. For this reason the Collingwood Football Club had to reverse its logo, which previously featured the flag until a logo refresh at the end of 2017.

There have been several attempts to make desecration of the Australian flag a crime. In 1953, during the second reading debate on the Flags Bill, the leader of the Opposition, Arthur Calwell, unsuccessfully called for provisions to be added to the bill to criminalise desecration. Michael Cobb introduced private member's bills in 1989, 1990, 1991 and 1992 to ban desecration, but on each occasion the bill lapsed. In 2002, the leader of the National Party, John Anderson, proposed to introduce laws banning desecration of the Australian flag, a call that attracted support from some parliamentarians both in his own party and the senior Coalition partner, the Liberal Party. The Prime Minister, John Howard, rejected the calls, stating that "in the end I guess it's part of the sort of free speech code that we have in this country". In 2003, the Australian flags (Desecration of the Flag) Bill was tabled in Parliament by Trish Draper without support from Howard and subsequently lapsed. In 2006, following a flag-burning incident during the 2005 Cronulla riots and a burnt flag display by a Melbourne artist, Liberal MP Bronwyn Bishop introduced the Protection of the Australian National Flag (Desecration of the Flag) Bill 2006. This bill sought to make it an offence to desecrate the flag by "wilfully destroying or otherwise mutilating the Australian National Flag in circumstances where a reasonable person would infer that the destruction or mutilation is intended publicly to express contempt or disrespect for the Flag or the Australian Nation". The bill received a second reading but subsequently lapsed and did not proceed to be voted in the House of Representatives.

== History ==
The Union Jack, as the flag of the British Empire, was first hoisted on Australian soil when Lieutenant James Cook landed at Botany Bay, on 29 April 1770. After commanding the First Fleet to Australia, Captain Arthur Phillip established a convict settlement at Sydney Cove on 26 January 1788. There he first raised the Union Jack on 7 February, when he proclaimed the Colony of New South Wales.

The Union Jack at that stage was the one introduced in 1606, which did not include the Saint Patrick's Saltire. It was incorporated after the Acts of Union 1801 between Great Britain and Ireland, hence featuring on the Australian flag. Each colony also had its own flag based on the Blue Ensign, defaced with a state badge.

As an Australian national consciousness began to emerge, several flag movements were formed and unofficial new flags came into common usage. Two attempts were made throughout the nineteenth century to design a national flag. The first such attempt was the National Colonial Flag created in 1823–1824 by Captains John Nicholson and John Bingle. This flag consisted of a red cross on a white background, with an eight-point star on each of the four limbs of the cross, while incorporating a Union Jack in the canton. The most popular national flag of the period was the 1831 Federation Flag, also designed by Nicholson. This flag was the same as the National Colonial Flag, except that the cross was blue instead of resembling that of St. George. Although the flag was designed by Nicholson in 1831, it did not become widely popular until the latter part of the century, when calls for federation began to grow louder.

These flags, and many others such as the Eureka Flag (which came into use at the Eureka Stockade in 1854), featured the Southern Cross. The oldest known flag to show the stars arranged as they are seen in the sky is the Anti-Transportation League Flag, which is similar in design to the present National Flag. The differences were that there was no Commonwealth Star, while the components of the Southern Cross are depicted with eight points and in gold. This flag was only briefly in usage, as two years after the formation of the Anti-Transportation League in 1851, the colonial authorities decided to stop the intake of convicts, so the ATL ceased its activities. The Eureka Flag has become an enduring symbol in Australian culture and has been used by various groups and movements. The Murray River Flag, popular since the 1850s, is still widely used by boats on Australia's main waterway. It is the same as the National Colonial Flag, except that the white background in the three quadrants other the canton were replaced with four alternating blue and white stripes, representing the four major rivers that run into the Murray River. Another early design with comparisons to the National Flag is the electoral banner used by William Charles Wentworth and William Bland as candidates for the 1843 New South Wales election.

National Colonial Flag

Australian Federation Flag

Eureka Flag

Anti-Transportation League Flag

Murray River Flag

=== 1901 Federal Flag Design Competition ===
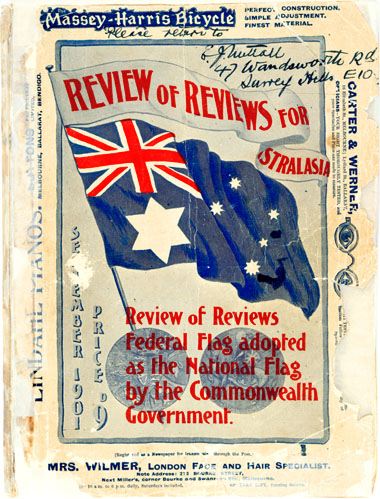
The edition of the Review of Reviews front cover signed by Egbert Nuttall, after the winning designers of the 1901 Federal Flag design competition were announced

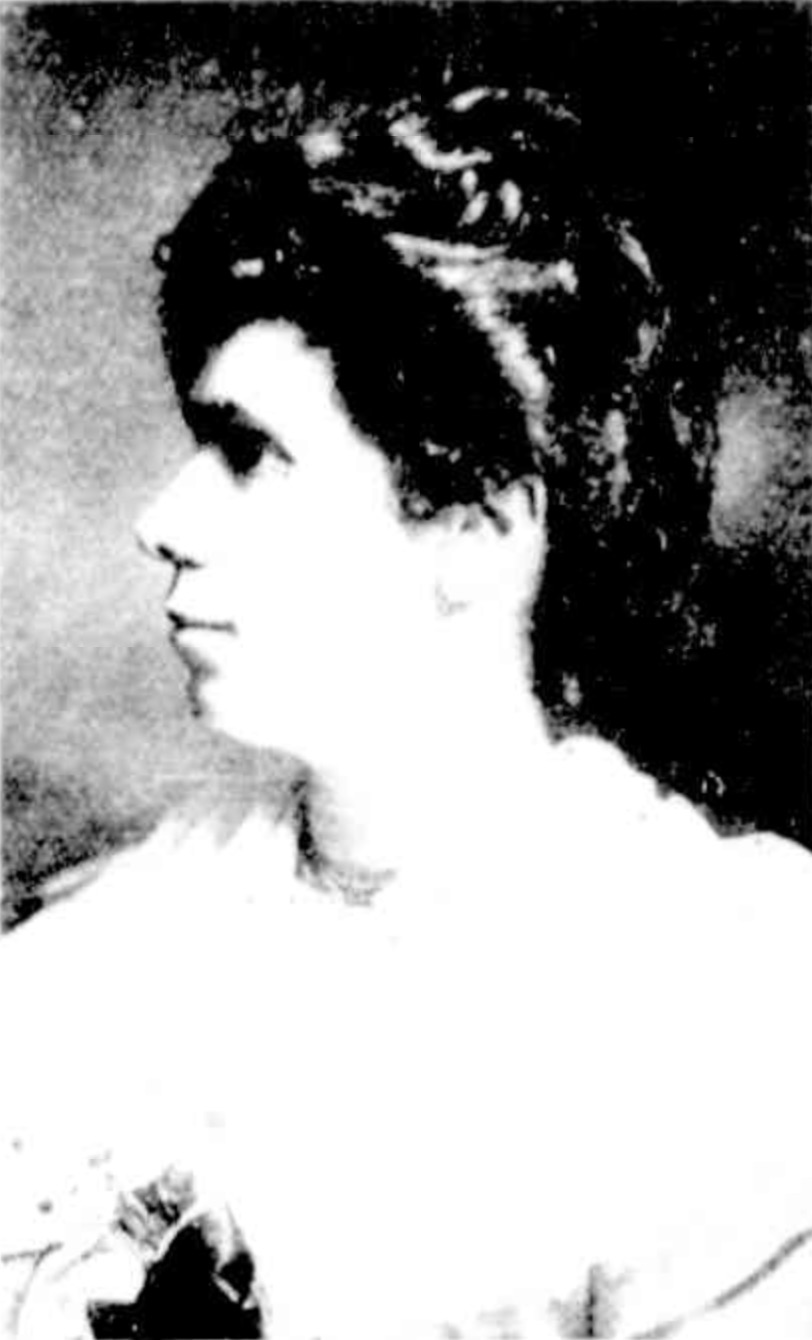
Annie Dorrington, one of the winning designers for the Australian flag

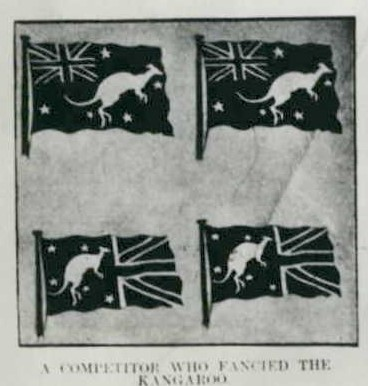
Entries for the Federal Flag Competition

As Federation approached, thoughts turned to an official federal flag. In 1900, the Melbourne Herald conducted a design competition with a prize of 25 Australian pounds (A$4,400 in 2021 terms). The competition conducted by the Review of Reviews for Australasia—a Melbourne-based publication— suggested that entries incorporate a design based on the British ensigns and around the Southern Cross, noting that designs without these emblems were unlikely to be successful. After Federation on 1 January 1901, and following receipt of a request from the British government to design a new flag, the new Commonwealth Government held an official competition for a new federal flag in April. The competition attracted 32,823 entries, including those originally sent to the Review of Reviews. One of these was submitted by an unnamed governor of a colony. The two contests were merged after the Review of Reviews agreed to being integrated into the government initiative. The £75 prize money of each competition were combined and augmented by a further £50 donated by Havelock Tobacco Company. Each competitor was required to submit two coloured sketches, a red ensign for the merchant service and public use, and a blue ensign for naval and official use. The judging criteria for the designs included historical relevance, compliance with the conventions of heraldry, originality, utility, and the cost of manufacture. The majority of designs incorporated the Union Jack and the Southern Cross, but native animals were also popular, including one that depicted a variety of indigenous animals playing cricket, a six-tailed kangaroo representing the six Australian states, and a kangaroo aiming a gun at the Southern Cross. The entries were put on display at the Royal Exhibition Building in Melbourne and the judges took six days to deliberate before reaching their conclusion. Five almost identical entries were chosen as the winning design, and the designers shared the £200 (2021: $35,200) prize money, with £40 each. They were Ivor Evans, a fourteen-year-old schoolboy from Melbourne; Leslie John Hawkins, a teenager apprenticed to an optician from Sydney; Egbert John Nuttall, an architect from Melbourne; Annie Dorrington, an artist from Perth; and William Stevens, a ship's officer from Auckland, New Zealand. The differences to the current flag were the six-pointed Commonwealth Star, while the components stars in the Southern Cross had different numbers of points, with more if the real star was brighter. This led to five stars of nine, eight, seven, six and five points respectively. The Inner Diameter of the six-pointed Federal Star in the lower Hoist was larger than that of the later seven-pointed version of the Federal Star in the lower Hoist. Alpha Crucis and Delta Crucis were of different sizes than they are today—with Alpha being larger than at present and Delta being smaller than at present.

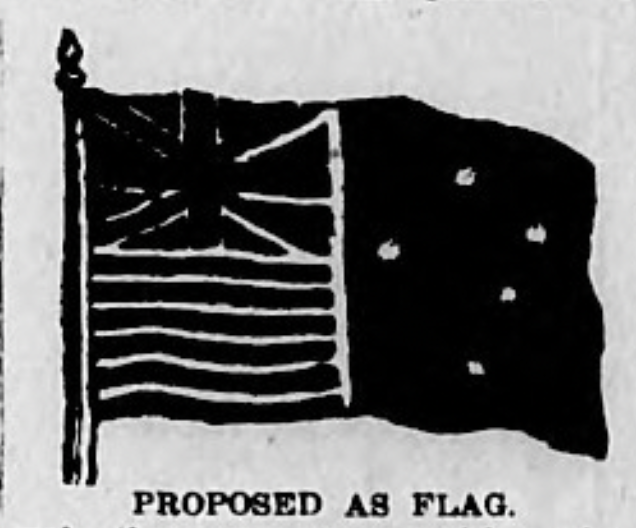
Etching of Melbourne Herald proposed flag, 1901

The flag's initial reception was mixed. Readers of The Age newspaper were told that,

a huge "Blue Ensign," with the prize design of the Southern Cross and a six pointed star thereon, was run up to the top of the flagstaff on the dome, and breaking, streamed out on the heavy south-westerly breeze a brave and inspiriting picture.

The report carried by the Argus newspaper was also celebratory in nature, stating,

In years to come the flag which floated yesterday in the Exhibition building over Her Excellency the Countess of Hopetoun, who stood for Great Britain, and the Prime Minister (Mr Barton), who stood for Australia, will, in all human probability, become the emblem upon which the millions of the free people of the Commonwealth will gaze with a thrill of national pride.

Alternatively, the then republican magazine The Bulletin labelled it,

a staled réchauffé of the British flag, with no artistic virtue, no national significance ... Minds move slowly: and Australia is still Britain's little boy. What more natural than that he should accept his father's cut-down garments, – lacking the power to protest, and only dimly realising his will. That bastard flag is a true symbol of the bastard state of Australian opinion.

Melbourne Herald competition winning design	Blue version of winning design	As approved by King Edward VII

As the design was basically the Victorian flag with a star added, many critics in both the Federal Government and the New South Wales Government objected to the chosen flag for being "too Victorian". They wanted the Australian Federation Flag, and prime minister Barton, who had been promoting the Federation Flag, submitted this flag along with that chosen by the judges to the Admiralty for final approval. The Admiralty chose the Red for private vessels and Blue Ensigns for government ships. The Barton government regarded both the Blue and Red Ensigns as colonial maritime flags and "grudgingly" agreed to fly it only on naval ships. Later governments, that of Chris Watson in 1904 and Andrew Fisher in 1910, were also unhappy with the design, wanting something "more distinctive" and more "indicative of Australian unity".

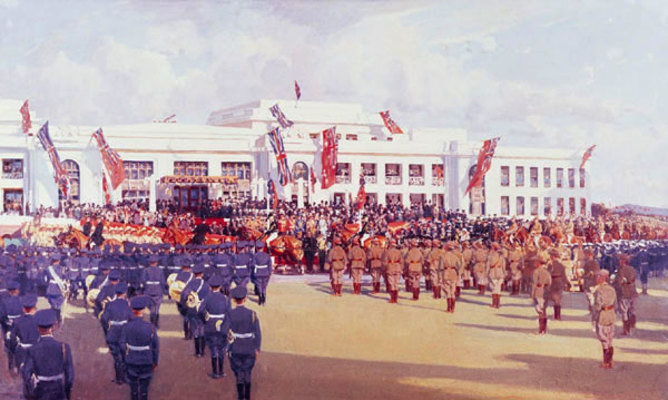
The original, official painting of the opening of Old Parliament House by Harold Septimus Power, showing numerous Red Ensigns alongside Union Jacks

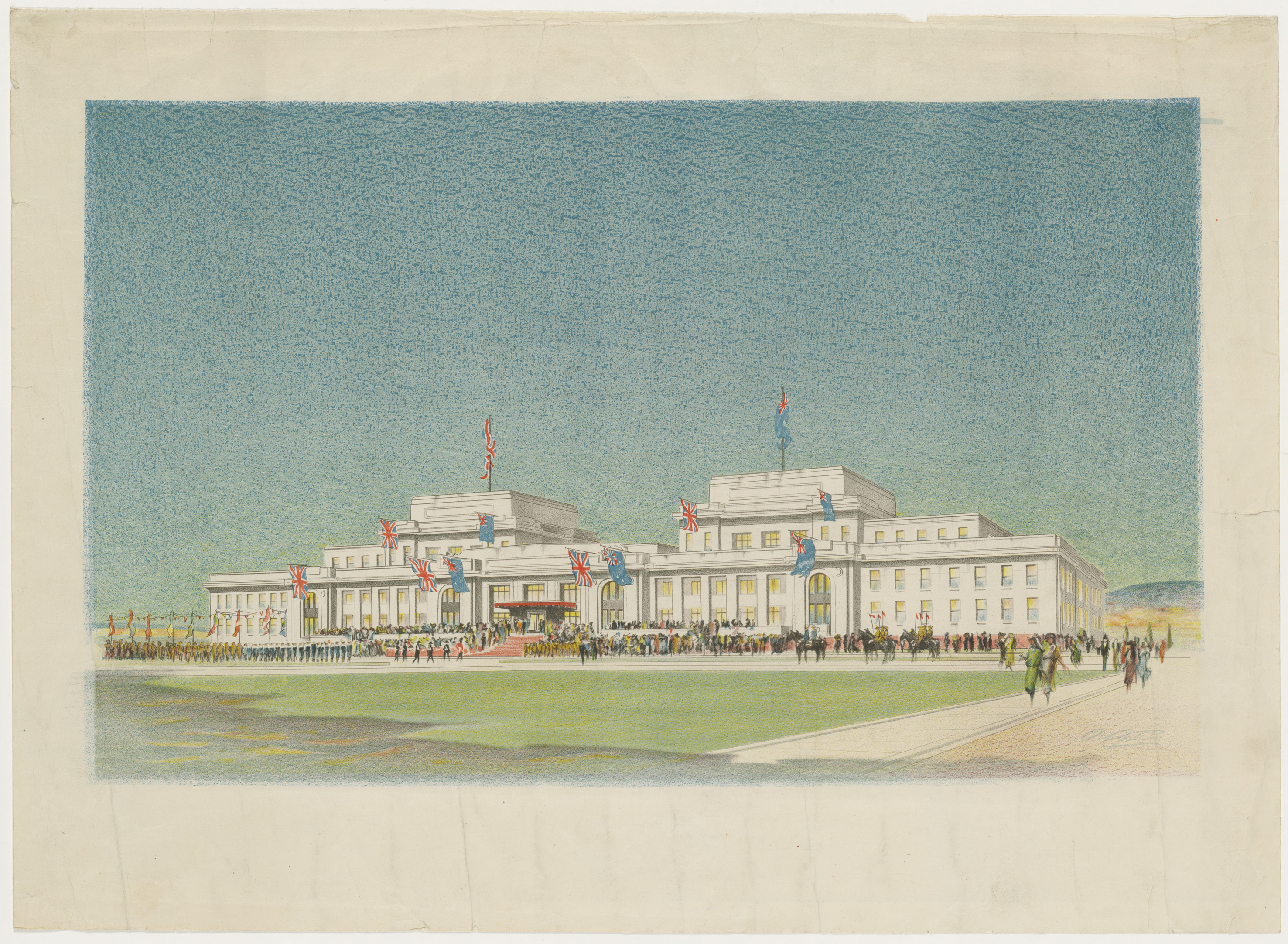
A colour lithograph by an unknown artist of the opening of provisional parliament house in Canberra, 9 May 1927

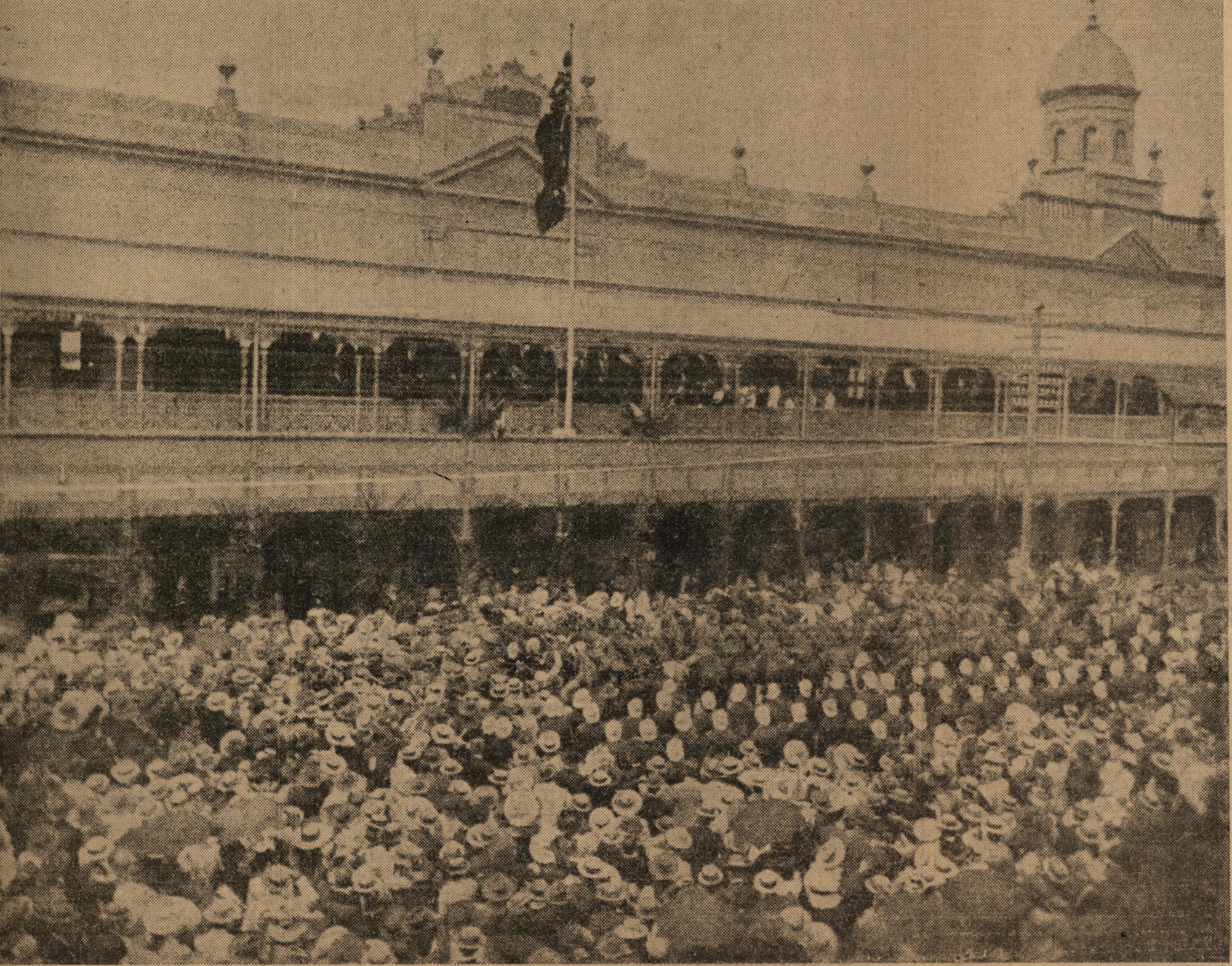
First raising of the Australian flag

On 3 September 1901, the new Australian flag flew for the first time from the dome of the Royal Exhibition Building in Melbourne. The names of the joint winners of the design competition were announced by Hersey, Countess of Hopetoun (the wife of the governor-general, the 7th Earl of Hopetoun) and she unfurled the flag for the first time. Since 1996 this date has been officially known as Australian National Flag Day.

The competition-winning designs were submitted to the British Colonial Secretary in 1902. Prime minister Edmund Barton announced in the Commonwealth Gazette that King Edward VII had officially approved the design as the flag of Australia on 11 February 1903. The published version made all the stars in the Southern Cross seven-pointed and of equal size apart from the smallest—and is the same as the current design except for the six-pointed Commonwealth Star. The flag was last altered in 1908 to its current form when a seventh point was added to the Commonwealth Star; this seventh point has come to represent all territories and any future states of Australia.

=== Blue versus Red Ensign ===
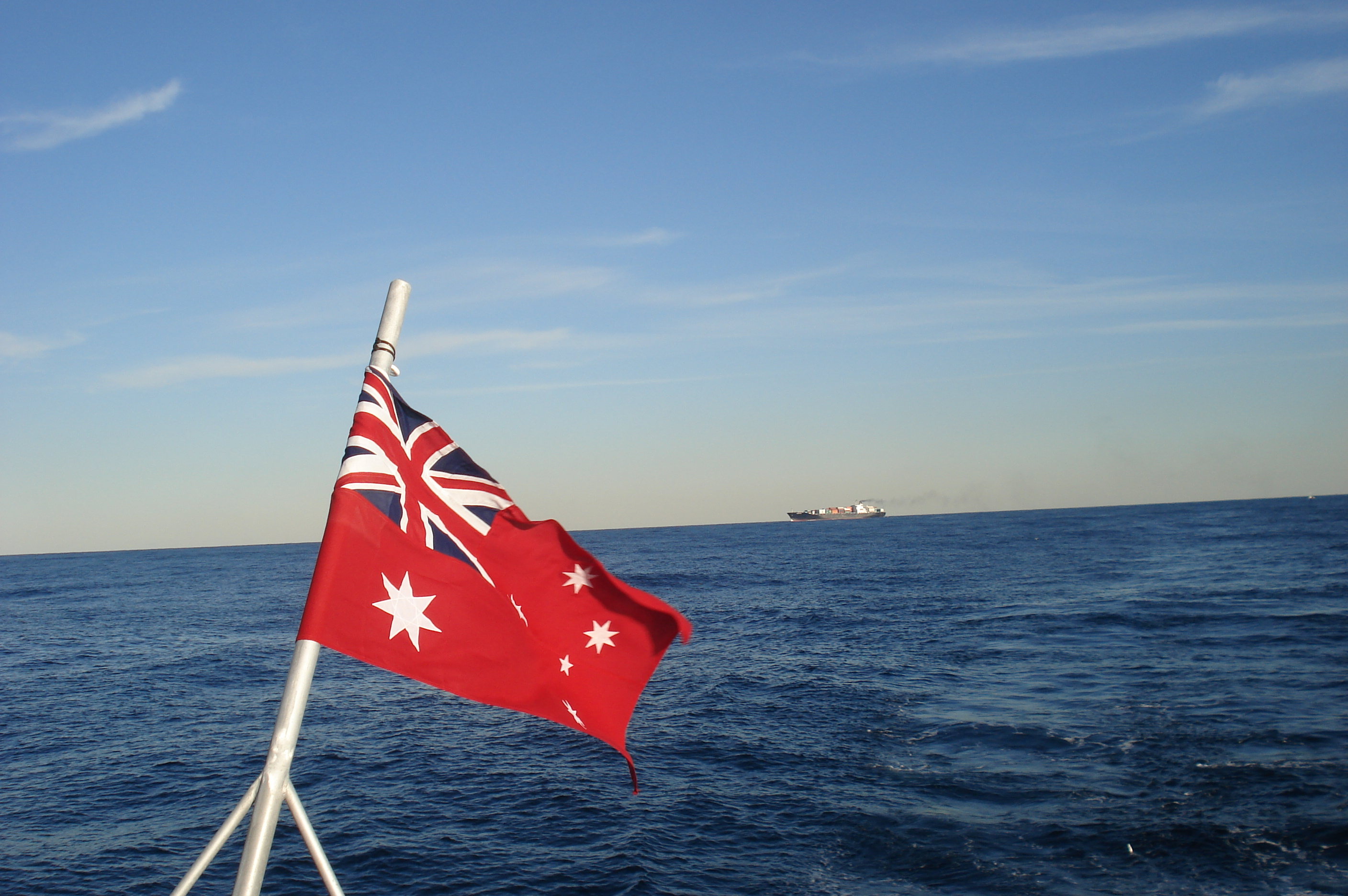
Australian Red Ensign in maritime use

In the decades following federation the Red Ensign was the pre-eminent flag in use by private citizens on land. This was largely due to the Commonwealth Government, assisted by flag suppliers, discouraging the use of the Blue Ensign by the general public. Both the blue and red versions were used by armed forces during the First and Second World Wars (see: Flags of the Australian Defence Force). A colourised version of a photograph held by the Australian War Memorial of the Armistice Day celebrations in Sydney's Martin Place, 11 November 1918, reveals both ensigns being displayed by the assembled crowd. Illustrations and photos of the opening of Australia's provisional Parliament House in 1927 show Australian Ensigns flown alongside Union Jacks. However, sources disagree on the colours of the Australian flags, leaving open the possibility that either ensign or both were used.

A 1934 issue of National Geographic covering the flags of the world and containing coloured illustrations describes the Red Ensign as "Australia – Merchant" and omits the Blue Ensign altogether. A memo from the Prime Minister's Department dated 6 March 1939 states that "the Red Ensign is the flag to be flown by the public generally" and the federal government policy was "The flying of the Commonwealth Blue Ensign is reserved for Commonwealth Government use but there is no reservation in the case of the Commonwealth Merchant Flag, or Red Ensign."

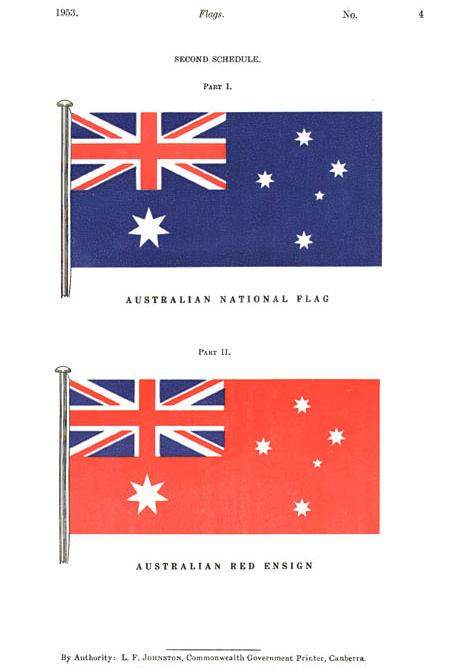
The Flags Act 1953 specified the Blue Ensign as the Australian National Flag and the Red Ensign as the merchant shipping flag.

In the 1940s, the federal government began to encourage public use of the blue ensign. Despite this, there remained confusion until the Flags Act 1953 declared the Blue Ensign to be the national flag and the Red Ensign the flag of the Australian mercantile marine. It has been claimed that this choice was made on the basis that the predominately red version carried too many communist overtones for the government of the day to be legislated for as the chief national symbol. This theory is unlikely, as since 1904 the Australian Government had given precedence to the blue ensign, for example by giving the right to fly it in schools in 1940. Blue suited the anti-communist policy of the Menzies government (and other organisations such as the Catholic Church), but it was also suitable to the Labor Party as it was the same colour as the Eureka Flag. The Red Ensign continues to be paraded on Anzac Day in recognition of its historical significance.

Technically, private non-commercial vessels were liable to a substantial fine if they did not fly the British Red Ensign. However, an Admiralty Warrant was issued on 5 December 1938, authorising these vessels to fly the Australian Red Ensign. The Shipping Registration Act 1981 reaffirmed that the Australian Red Ensign was the proper colours for commercial ships over 24 metres (79 ft) in tonnage length.

As a result of the declaration of 3 September as Merchant Navy Day in 2008, the Red Ensign can be flown on land alongside the Australian national flag on this occasion as a matter of protocol.

=== Status of the Union Jack ===
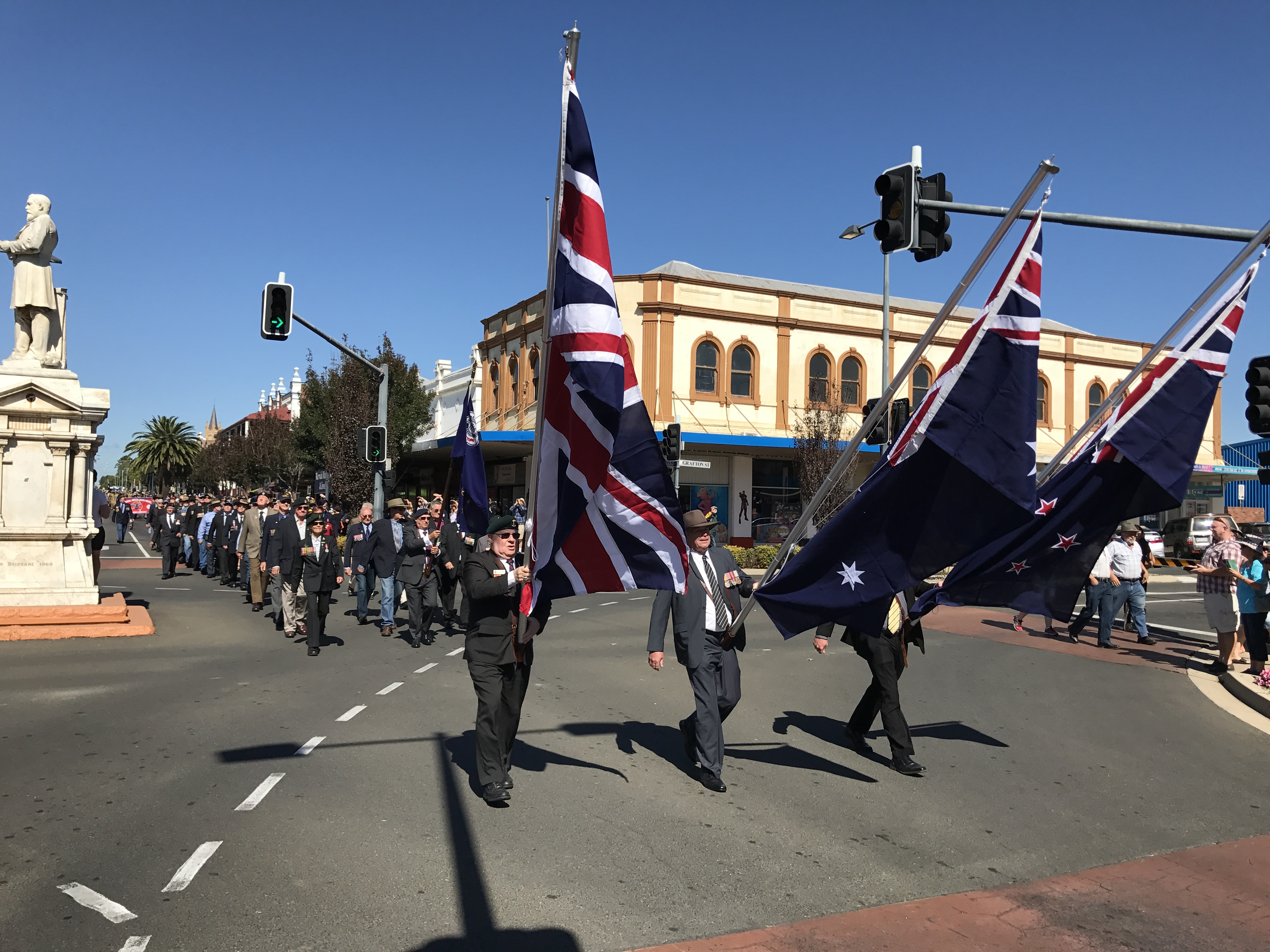
The Union Jack, New Zealand flag and Australian flag in an Anzac Day march in 2017

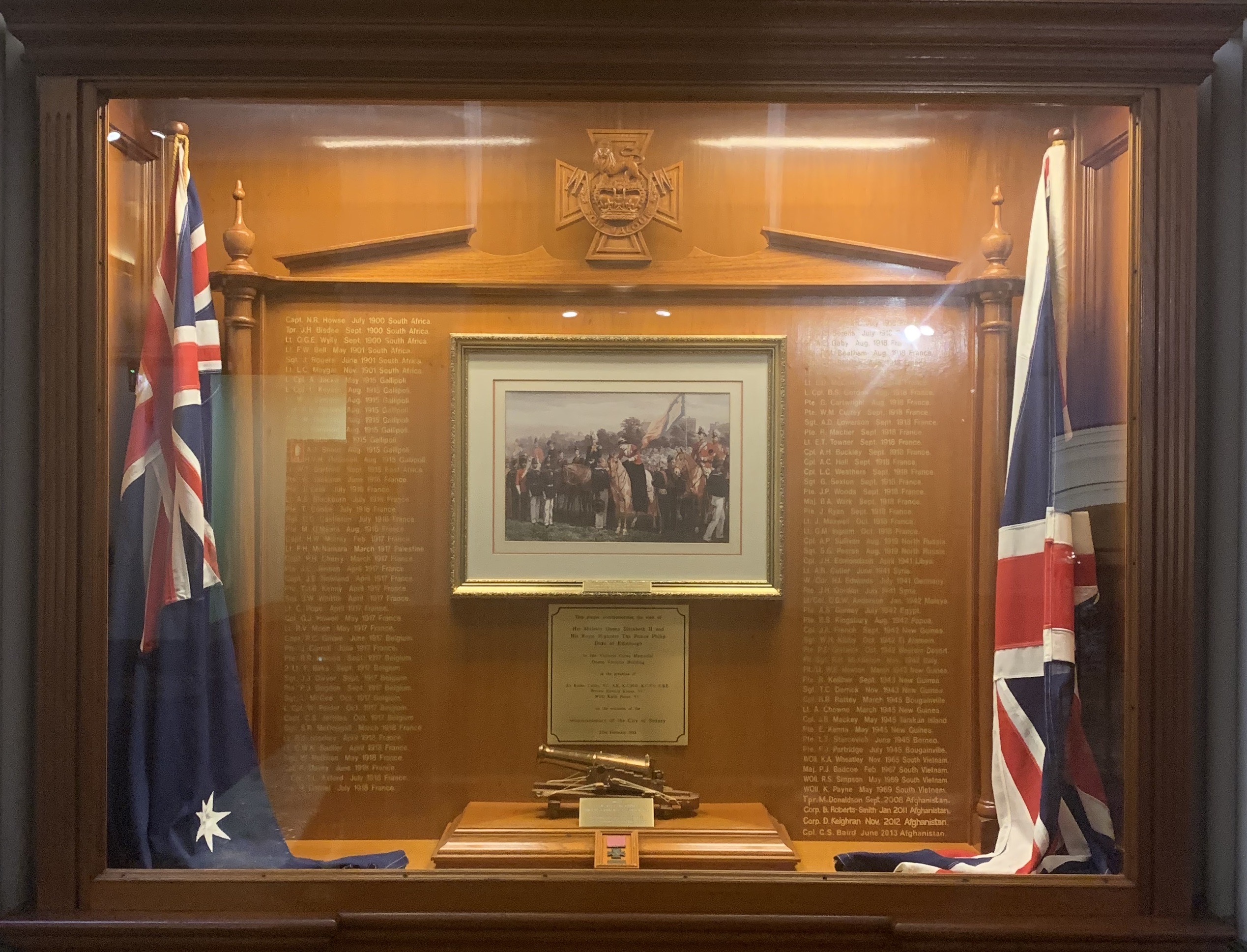
The Australian flag and the Union Jack embellishing the Victoria Cross Memorial in the Queen Victoria Building, Sydney

The Blue Ensign replaced the Union Jack at the Olympic Games at St Louis in 1904. In the same year, due to lobbying by Richard Crouch MP, it had the same status as the Union Jack in the UK, when the Australian House of Representatives proclaimed that the Blue Ensign "should be flown upon all forts, vessels, saluting places and public buildings of the Commonwealth upon all occasions when flags are used". The government agreed to fly the Blue Ensign on special flag days, but not if it meant additional expense, which undermined the motion. The Blue Ensign could only be flown on a state government building if a state flag was not available.

On 2 June 1904 a resolution was passed by parliament to replace the Union Jack with the "Australian flag" on forts. Initially the Department of Defence resisted using the Flag, considering it to be a marine ensign and favouring King's Regulations that specified the use of the Union Jack. After being approached by the Department of Defence, prime minister Chris Watson stated in parliament that he was not satisfied with the design of the Australian flag and that implementation of the 1904 resolution could wait until consideration was given to "adopt another [flag] which in our opinion is more appropriate". In 1908, Australian Army Military Order, No 58/08 ordered the "Australian Ensign" replace the Union Jack at all military establishments. From 1911 it was the saluting flag of the Australian army at all reviews and ceremonial parades.

The Royal Australian Navy (RAN) was promulgated on 5 October 1911 and was directed to fly the British White Ensign on the stern and the flag of Australia on the jackstaff. Despite the government wanting to use the Blue Ensign on Australian warships, officers continued to fly the Union Jack, and it was not until 1913, following public protest in Fremantle after its use for the review of HMAS Melbourne, that the government reminded them of the 1911 legislation. The British White Ensign was finally replaced by a distinctively Australian White Ensign on 1 March 1967 (see Flags of the Australian Defence Force). Despite the new Australian flags official use, from 1901 until the 1920s the Federation Flag remained the most popular Australian flag for public and even some official events. It was flown at the 1907 State Premiers conference in Melbourne and during the 1927 visit to Australia of the Duke and Duchess of York, the future King George VI and Queen Elizabeth.

In 1940 the Victorian government passed legislation allowing schools to purchase Blue Ensigns, which in turn allowed its use by private citizens. Prime minister Robert Menzies then recommended schools, government building and private citizens to use the Blue Ensign, issuing a statement the following year allowing Australians to use either ensign providing it was done so respectfully. Prime minister Ben Chifley issued a similar statement in 1947.

On 4 December 1950, the Prime minister Robert Menzies affirmed the Blue ensign as the National flag and in 1951 King George VI approved the government's recommendation.

When the Flags Bill was introduced into parliament on 20 November 1953, Menzies stated that the bill was "largely a formal measure which puts into legislative form what has become almost the established practice in Australia". However, historian Elizabeth Kwan argues that Menzies was actually hiding the fact that the bill would give priority to the Australian flag over the Union Jack for the first time, in order to avoid alienating those who still considered the Union Jack the national flag.

This status was formalised on 14 February 1954, when Queen Elizabeth II gave royal assent to the Flags Act 1953, which had been passed two months earlier. The monarch's assent was timed to coincide with the Queen's visit to the country and came after she had opened the new session of Parliament. The act confers statutory powers on the governor-general to appoint "flags and ensigns of Australia" and authorise warrants and make rules as to use of flags. Section 8 ensures that the "right or privilege" of a person to fly the Union Jack is not affected by the act.

South Australia chose to continue with the Union Jack as the national flag until 1956, when schools were given the option of using either the Union Jack or Australian flag. The former was still regarded as the national flag by many Australians well into the 1970s, which inspired Arthur Smout's campaign from 1968 to 1982 to encourage Australians to give the Australian flag precedence.

By the mid-1980s, the Commonwealth Government no longer reminded Australians they had the right to fly the Union Jack alongside the National Flag or provided illustrations of how to correctly display them together.

In 1977, the Australian flag was first displayed in the House of Representatives in Old Parliament House. It continued to be displayed in the chamber on the opening New Parliament House in 1988. Subsequently, the flag was displayed in the Senate for the first time in 1992.

=== Increasing debate (1980s–1990s) ===
Mild but persistent debates over the status of the flag (and especially the presence of the Union Jack in the canton) came to head during the Australian bicentenary in 1988 and during the prime ministership of Paul Keating. Two lobby groups respectively supporting a flag change and opposing it were created in this period: Ausflag (established 1981), which supports changing the flag, and the Australian National Flag Association (ANFA) (established 1983), which wants to keep the existing flag.

Changing the flag became official Australian Labor Party party policy in 1982, but the commitment was later dropped in 1988. Later prime minister Paul Keating publicly called for the flag to be changed stating,

I do not believe that the symbols and the expression of the full sovereignty of Australian nationhood can ever be complete while we have a flag with the flag of another country on the corner of it.

However, in 1994 Keating dropped his push to change the flag, focusing instead on the (ultimately unsuccessful) promotion of republicanism. Around the same time, several prominent organisations with the flag in their logos removed it, such as the Australian Labor Party, Ansett Australia and the National Australia Day Council.

=== 2000s to present ===
The Liberal Howard government was elected in 1996, leading to greater government promotion of the flag. An amendment to the Flags Act 1953 was passed that required a plebiscite to be held before the flag could be changed (although legally the amendment could be repealed by any future Parliament). The Howard government also required that all schools install a flagpole and fly the Australian flag as a condition to receiving federal funding, distributed material from the ANFA to schools, published material encouraging increasing ritualistic care of the flag, and advised the declaration of 3 September as Flag Day. Flag Day commemorates the anniversary of the flag being first flown in 1901.

During this period, displays of the Australian flag became more common, especially in the context of Australia Day. However, in some contexts it also became associated with exclusionary nationalism and nativism, being prominent for instance at the Cronulla riots.

As of 2025, the Institute of Public Affairs ran a poll and found "75% per cent of Australians believe we should keep our National Flag, just 10 per cent disagree".

== Centenary flags ==
=== Centenary flag of state ===
On the centenary of the first flying of the flag, 3 September 2001, the Australian National Flag Association presented the then prime minister John Howard with a flag at the Royal Exhibition Building intended to replace the missing original flag. This flag was not a replica of the original flag, on which the Commonwealth Star had only six points, but was a current Australian National Flag with a seven pointed Commonwealth Star. The flag has a special headband, including a cardinal red stripe and an inscription. (Note: It reads: "The Centenary Flag. Presented to the Hon John Howard MP, Prime Minister of Australia on behalf of the people of Australia by the Australian National Flag Association on 3 September 2001 at the Royal Exhibition Building, Melbourne to commemorate the first flying of the Australian National Flag on 3 September 1901 attended by the Rt Hon Sir Edmund Barton MHR, Prime Minister of Australia.") The red stripe represents the "crimson thread of kinship of all peoples of Australia"; an idea sourced from a Henry Parkes speech that urged Federation, due to the "crimson thread of kinship" of a common British origin that connected the colonists together.

A warrant authorising the use of the Centenary Flag under section 6 of the Flags Act was issued by the Governor-General and the flag is now used as the official flag of state on important occasions. These included the opening of new parliamentary terms and when visiting heads of state arrive. The flag has been transported across the country for flying in every state and territory. It was later used on Remembrance Day in 2003 for the opening of the Australian War Memorial in Hyde Park in London.

=== Parliament house centenary flag ===
On 18 September 2001 during the centenary of federation the federal member for Hinkler, Paul Neville, requested to the speaker that

before [the flag] becomes too faded or too tattered, [it] be taken down and perhaps offered to a museum or an art gallery as the seminal flag that flew over this building 100 years from the time the first flag was flown?

The parliament house centenary flag was subsequently entrusted to the Australian Flag Society and has been paraded at schools to mark Australian National Flag Day on a tour of the Australian Capital Territory, New South Wales and Queensland.

== Other Australian flags ==
Civil Air Ensign (adopted 1935, modified 1948)

Flag of the Governor-General of Australia (adopted 1936)

Royal Australian Navy Ensign (adopted 1967)

Royal Australian Air Force Ensign (adopted 1949, modified 1982)

Australian Defence Force Ensign (proclaimed 2000)

Royal Standard of Australia (proclaimed 2024)

Australian Aboriginal flag (designed 1971, proclaimed 1995)

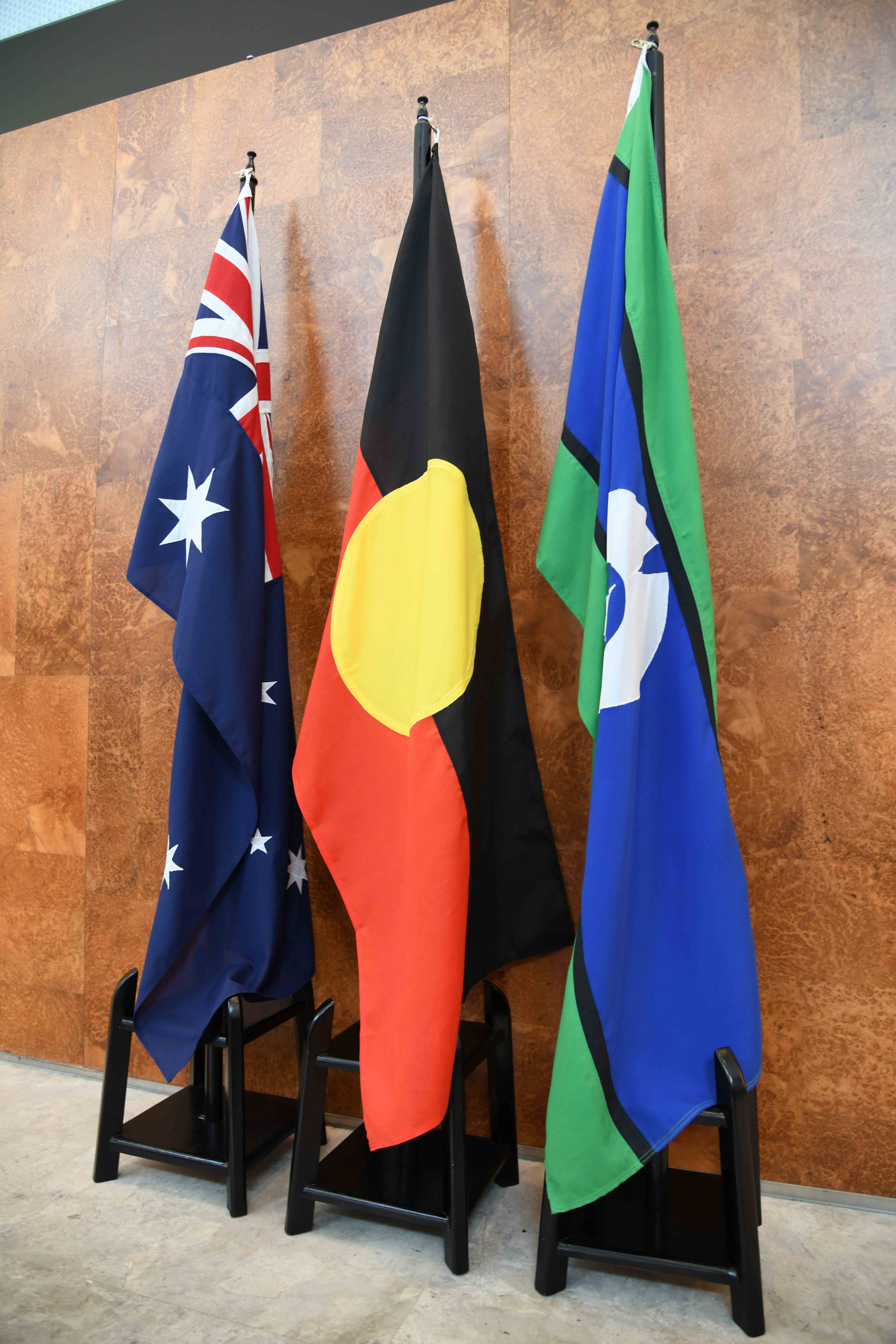
The Australian national, Aboriginal and Torres Strait Islander flags as they are often displayed at official events

Under section 5 of the Flags Act 1953, the governor-general may proclaim flags other than the National Flag and the Red Ensign as flags or ensigns of Australia. Five flags have been appointed in this manner. The first two were the Royal Australian Navy Ensign and the Royal Australian Air Force Ensign, the flags used by the Royal Australian Navy and the Royal Australian Air Force. The Australian Army has no ensign of its own, but they are given the ceremonial task to be the defender of the National Flag. The Air Force and the Navy flew the appropriate British ensigns (the White Ensign and the Royal Air Force Ensign) until the adoption of similar ensigns based on the Australian National Flag in 1948 and 1967 respectively. The current Navy and Air Force Ensigns were officially appointed in 1967 and 1982 respectively.

The King's Flag for Australia (adopted 30 August 2024) is flown when the monarch visits Australia and is used in a similar fashion to the Royal Standard of the United Kingdom. It replaces Queen Elizabeth's personal Australian flag (adopted 20 September 1962), the first Australian personal flag adopted by an Australian monarch.

In 1995, the Aboriginal flag and the Torres Strait Islander flag were also appointed flags of Australia. While mainly seen as a gesture of reconciliation, this recognition caused a small amount of controversy at the time, with then opposition leader John Howard describing it as divisive. Some Indigenous people, such as the flag's designer Harold Thomas, felt that the government was appropriating their flag, saying it "doesn't need any more recognition". However, Thomas later transferred the flag's copyright to the Commonwealth Government, expressing hope that doing so would "provide comfort to all Aboriginal people and Australians to use the flag".

The Australian Defence Force Ensign was proclaimed in 2000. This flag is used to represent the Defence Force when more than one branch of the military is involved, such as at the Australian Defence Force Academy, and by the Minister for Defence.

The Legislative Instruments Act 2003 required the proclamations of these flags to be lodged in a Federal Register. Due to an administrative oversight they were not, and the proclamations were automatically repealed. The governor-general of Australia issued new proclamations dated 25 January 2008, with effect from 1 January 2008 (or 1 October 2006 in the case of the Defence Force Ensign).

In addition to the seven flags declared under the Flags Act, there are three additional Australian Government flags, the Australian Civil Aviation Ensign, Australian Border Force Flag and the Australian Federal Police Flag, eight vice-regal flags and nine state and territory flags that are recognised as official flags through other means.

== Flag debate ==
A poster calling for a redesign of the Australian flag, released by Ausflag in 2000 to coincide with the 2000 Summer Olympics

There are two lobby groups involved in the flag debate: Ausflag (established 1981), which supports changing the flag, and the Australian National Flag Association (ANFA) (established 1983), which wants to keep the existing flag. The primary arguments for keeping the flag cite historic precedence, while those for changing the flag are based around the idea that the status quo does not accurately depict Australia's status as an independent and multicultural nation, nor is its design unique enough to easily distinguish it from similar flags, such as the flags of New Zealand, Cook Islands and Tuvalu (despite the counter argument that this is not uncommon, as seen with Romania and Chad sharing near identical flags). The similarity between the flag of Australia and those of other countries is often derived from a common colonial history.

Ausflag periodically campaigns for flag change in association with national events such as the 2000 Summer Olympics, and holds flag design competitions, while ANFA's activities include promotion of the existing flag through events such as National Flag Day. On Australia Day in 2018, Ausflag released an alternative design of the flag without the Union Jack, featuring a Commonwealth Star and Southern Cross. The date of the release was met with some backlash, which Harold Scruby, Ausflag's executive director called "the lowest form of censorship". Following the release, Malcolm Turnbull, then-prime minister and a former Ausflag director, told the group that the flag would never change, viewing it as an important symbol of Australian history.

A 2004 Newspoll that asked: "Are you personally in favour or against changing the Australian flag so as to remove the Union Jack emblem?" was supported by 32% of respondents and opposed by 57%, with 11% uncommitted. (Note: According to a breakdown of the figures, 41% said they were "strongly" opposed, more than favoured change overall.) A 2010 Morgan Poll that asked: "Do you think Australia should have a new design for our National Flag?" was supported by 29% of respondents and opposed by 66%, with 5% uncommitted. A 2013 survey found that 95 per cent of surveyed adults stated that they took pride in the national flag, which was enjoying increasing popularity; half (50%) said they were extremely proud. Conversely, a 2016 self-selected non-weighted online survey from Western Sydney University found that 64% of the responders wanted the flag to change, with 36% wanting it to remain the same.

== See also ==
- List of Australian flags
- National colours of Australia
- Boxing kangaroo
- Historical flags of the British Empire and the overseas territories
- Flag of New Zealand
