= Ausflag =

Group promoting a new flag for Australia

Ausflag Limited
- Formation: 1981; 13 January 1983 (incorporated as a non-profit company)
- Founder: Harold Scruby
- Type: Non-profit advocacy group
- Registration no.: ACN: 008 581 191; ABN: 66 008 581 191
- Legal status: Public company limited by guarantee
- Purpose: "[T]o secure the popular support of the Australian people for the adoption of an Australian flag, anthem, and colours."
- Members: 12
- chairman: Robert Webster
- executive director: Harold Scruby
- Website: https://www.ausflag.com.au
- Formerly called: AusFlag 1988

Ausflag Limited is a group that promotes changing the Australian flag. It was formed in 1981 and has promoted at least seven different designs as a new flag. In the 44–45 years since it was formed, it remains unsuccessful and none of its flag designs have been significantly used in the community.

Ausflag was affiliated with NZFlag, a now defunct trust that promoted a redesign of the Flag of New Zealand.

== History ==
Ausflag was formed in 1981 by Singapore-born Harold Scruby who, after 44–45 years, is still its executive director. Scruby has been criticised for the structure and control of organisations he has formed. Ausflag offers for people to join as "supporters" but voting membership is by invitation only.

=== Campaigns ===
Ausflag promoted design competitions for a new flag, in 1986, before the bicentenary, in 1993, after Sydney was selected to hold the 2000 Summer Olympics and in 1998, before the new millennium.

In January 2011, Ausflag drafted a statement in support of a new flag.

On Australia Day 2013, Ausflag launched a seventh flag design, a concept for an Australian sporting flag.

== Supporters ==
Ausflag supporters have included Nicholas Whitlam, Phillip Adams, Cathy Freeman, Janet Holmes à Court and Nick Greiner. Ausflag's 2011 statement in support of a new flag has been signed by over a dozen Australian of the Year recipients, including Patrick McGorry, Ian Kiernan, Dawn Fraser, Shane Gould, Ian Frazer, Gustav Nossal and Tim Flannery. Malcolm Turnbull, former chair of the Australian Republican Movement and later Prime Minister of Australia, left the Ausflag board in 1994 after being asked for his resignation and, in 2004, he joined the Australian National Flag Association, which opposes any changes to the flag.

== See also ==
- Australian flag debate
- Australian Flag Society
- Australian National Flag Association
- Australian Republic Movement
