= Australian Red Ensign =

Civil ensign of Australia

- Use: Civil ensign
- Proportion: 1:2
- Adopted: 11 February 1903 in use from 3 September 1901; 23 February 1908 (current seven-pointed Commonwealth Star version)
- Design: A Red Ensign with the Commonwealth/Federation Star at the hoist, and the Southern Cross in the fly half

The Australian Red Ensign is the civil ensign of Australia, the flag of nationality flown by Australian registered ships. It is a red version of the national flag, which is mainly blue. Both flags resulted from the Commonwealth Government's 1901 Federal Flag Design Competition which required two entries: an ensign for Commonwealth Government use and another for the merchant navy. The winning design for the merchant ensign was based on the traditional British Red Ensign and featured the Southern Cross and Commonwealth Star.

== Devices ==
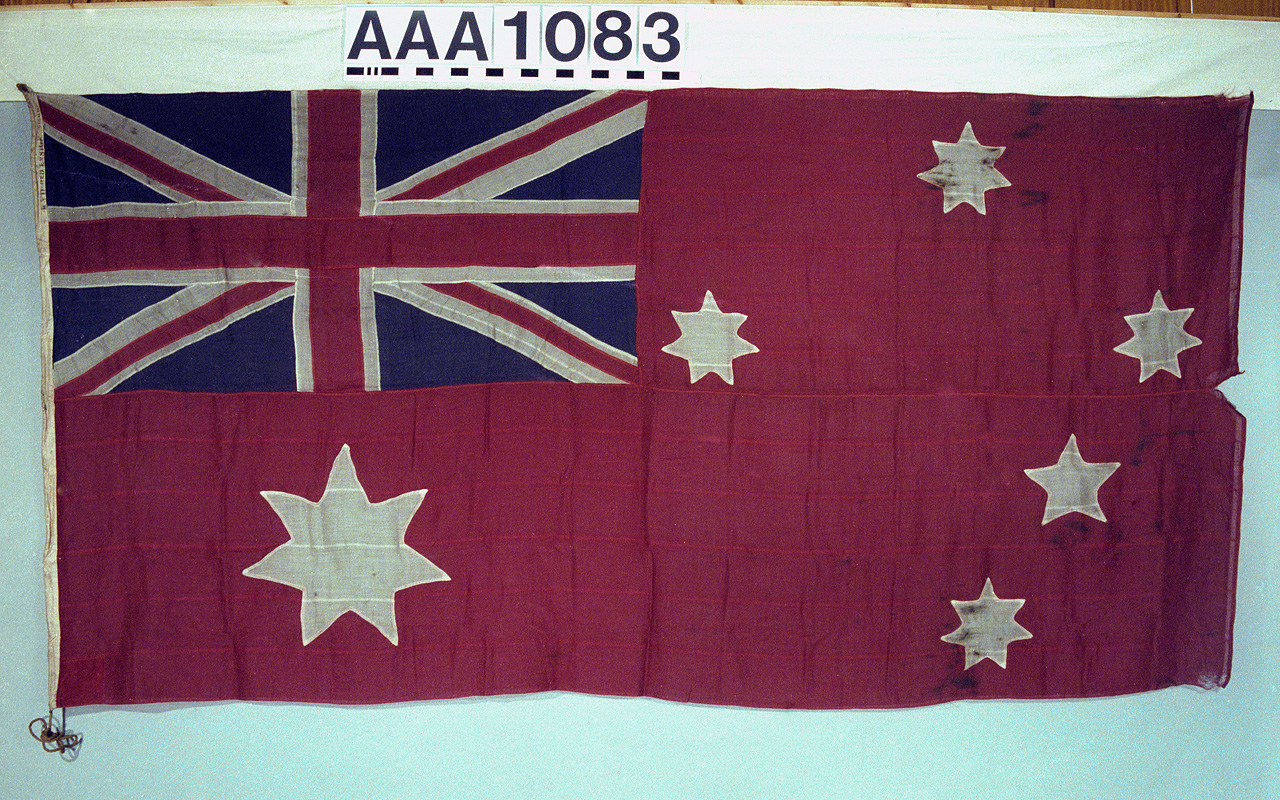
An Australian Red Ensign (Royal Museums Greenwich)

The Australian Red Ensign is a predominantly red version of the Australian national flag, using the same shade of red as the Saint George's Cross which is part of the Union Jack present in the canton.

== Maritime ensign ==
Following federation in 1901, the topic of national colours for British ships registered in Australian ports was addressed by the Navigation Act, which provided that such ships (i.e., civilian ships) should wear the Australian Red Ensign. Technically private non-registered vessels were liable to a substantial fine if they did not fly the British Red Ensign as they were not formally covered by the Navigation Act. However, an Admiralty Warrant was issued on 5 December 1938 which authorised such non-registered vessels to fly the Australian Red Ensign, too. Australia enacted fully domestic shipping legislation in 1981. The Shipping Registration Act of 1981 reaffirmed that the Australian Red Ensign was the proper "colours" for Australian registered ships and that smaller (i.e., less than 30 tons) pleasure and fishing craft could fly either the Australian Red Ensign or the Australian national flag but not both at the same time. Government vessels may also fly either.

== History ==
The Commonwealth Government ran the Federal Flag Design Competition in 1901 to find two designs for Australian flags: one for official Commonwealth Government use and another for the merchant navy. After being submitted to King Edward VII for approval the competition-winning design which featured a southern cross with nine, eight, seven, six and five points respectively, and with Alpha Crucis being larger than Beta and Gamma as well as with Delta being smaller than Beta and Gamma, was standardised by the British Admiralty with the number of points on the four biggest stars of the southern cross set to seven and the four main Stars of the southern cross being equal in size—ostensibly to improve ease of manufacture. The original variety of points and sizes was an indication of the relative brightness of each star as it appeared in the night sky. In 1908, the current Commonwealth star of seven points replaced the earlier six-pointed star and has a smaller Inner Diameter.

Australian/Commonwealth Red Ensign (1901–1903)

Australian/Commonwealth Red Ensign (1903–1908)

In the decades following federation the Red Ensign was the pre-eminent flag in use by private citizens on land. This was largely due to the Commonwealth government, assisted by flag suppliers, discouraging use of the Commonwealth Blue Ensign, now known as the Australian national flag, by the general public. By traditional British understanding, the Blue Ensign was reserved for official government use although the Red Ensign was nevertheless still in military circulation until after the 1953 legislation, meaning the 1st and 2nd Australian Imperial Forces served under both the blue and red versions. State and local governments, private organisations and individuals were expected to use the Red Ensign.

In the 1920s there was debate over whether the Blue Ensign was reserved for Commonwealth buildings only, culminating in a 1924 agreement that the Union Flag should take precedence as the National Flag and that state and local governments were henceforth able to use the blue ensign. A memo from the Prime Minister's Department dated 6 March 1939 states that: "the Red Ensign is the flag to be flown by the public generally" and the federal government policy was "The flying of the Commonwealth Blue Ensign is reserved for Commonwealth Government use but there is no reservation in the case of the Commonwealth Merchant Flag, or Red Ensign".

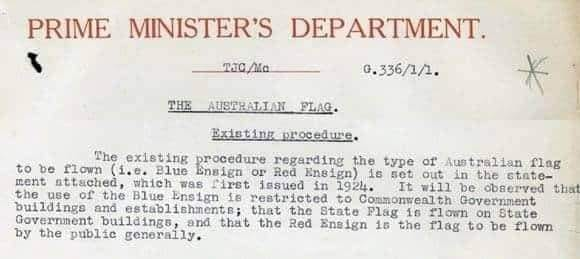
Extract of memo from the Prime Minister's Department dated 6 March 1939 concerning flag flying procedures.

In 1940 the Victorian government passed legislation allowing schools to purchase blue ensigns. The following year prime minister Robert Menzies issued a media release recommending that the Blue Ensign be flown at schools, government buildings and by private citizens and continued use of the Red Ensign by merchant ships, providing it was done so respectfully. Prime Minister Ben Chifley issued a similar statement in 1947.

Despite executive branch proclamations as to the respective roles of the two red, white and blue ensigns, there remained some confusion until the Flags Act 1953 declared the Blue Ensign to be the Australian national flag, leaving the Australian red ensign to its status as the civil ensign.

=== Adoption by anti-government activists ===
In the early 2020s, some Australian anti-government activists, including so-called sovereign citizens, and anti-vaccine mandate and related protests, adopted the Australian red ensign for their own purposes. The protesters often fly the flag upside down. Its use in this way is seen by many as disrespectful and insulting towards the soldiers who fought under the flag. The Returned & Services League of Australia (RSL) called it a "dishonour to Australian service men and women who have made the ultimate sacrifice for our nation". It is unclear why the Australian Red Ensign was adopted by such groups. Australian government flag protocol says that the flag should never be flown upside down in any circumstances.

== Merchant Navy Day ==
Australian National Flag Day was proclaimed in 1996.

Since 2008, 3 September has also been officially commemorated as Merchant Navy Day which allows the Australian red ensign to be flown on land for the occasion as a matter of protocol. Merchant Navy Day is an official recognition of the merchant navy's contribution in wartime, in particular the Pacific campaign in World War II.

== Historical Red Ensigns ==
Red Ensign of the Commonwealth Lighthouse Service

Red Ensign of South Australia (1870–1876)

Red Ensign of Victoria (1870)

New South Wales customs flag (1832–1882)

New South Wales customs flag (1882–1901)

=== Notable specimens ===
In 2024, it was reported in the Corryong Courier that the Australian Flag Society had discovered an Australian Red Ensign bearing the words "Changi '41 '42" and "Chitty flag", which may have flown over the Changi Football League game where POW Peter Chitty was awarded the "Changi Brownlow" medal.

== See also ==
- Canadian Red Ensign
- Hong Kong Blue Ensign
