= Flag Day (Australia) =

Commemoration of the Australian flag

Australian National Flag Day
- Observed by: Australia
- Type: Patriotic, Historical, Nationalist
- Significance: Anniversary of the first flying of the Australian National Flag in 1901
- Observances: Flag-raising ceremonies
- Date: 3 September
- Next time: 3 September 2025
- Frequency: annual

Australian National Flag Day has been celebrated in Australia since 3 September 1996. It commemorates the day in 1901 on which the Australian National Flag was first flown. Since 2008, the same day has also been commemorated as Merchant Navy Day, which allows the Australian Red Ensign to be flown on land on the occasion.

It is not a public holiday, nor widely celebrated by the public.

== Background ==
On 3 September 1901, Prime Minister Edmund Barton announced the winners of the official 1901 Federal Flag Design Competition, and a large flag, 5.5 by 11 metres (18 by 36 ft), was flown over the dome of the Royal Exhibition Building in Melbourne.

The idea of an annual day specifically celebrating the Australian National Flag dates from 1984. In that year the New South Wales branch of the Australian National Flag Association (ANFA) arranged for 3 September to be observed as "Australian National Flag Day" at a public ceremony held in Hyde Park, Sydney. The official centenary of federation flag raising event was held at the national maritime museum in 2001.

On 28 August 1996, the Governor-General of Australia, Sir William Deane, issued a proclamation that officially established 3 September as Australian National Flag Day.

Since 2008, 3 September has also been officially commemorated as Merchant Navy Day which allows the Australian Red Ensign to be flown on land for the occasion as a matter of protocol. Merchant Navy Day is an official recognition of the merchant navy's contribution in wartime, in particular the Pacific campaign in World War II.

== Observances and traditions ==
On Flag Day 1996 an official ceremony took place during the long running event held at Martin Place Amphitheatre in the centre of Sydney. On that occasion David Jull, Minister for Administrative Services, made a commemorative address reading a message from the Prime Minister, John Howard, welcoming the proclamation of 3 September as Australian National Flag Day. He then presented the ANFA with a copy of the proclamation signed by Sir William Deane.
