= Flags Act 1953 =

Australian act of Parliament defining the flags of Australia

Parliament of Australia
- Long title: An Act to declare a certain Flag to be the Australian National Flag and to make other provision with respect to Flags
- Citation: Flags Act 1953 (Cth)
- Enacted by: House of Representatives
- Enacted by: Senate
- Royal assent: 14 February 1954
- Commenced: 14 April 1954

Legislative history

Initiating chamber: House of Representatives
- Introduced by: Robert Menzies
- Third reading: 2 December 1953

Revising chamber: Senate
- Third reading: 3 December 1953

Amended by
- Statute Law Revision Act 2008, Flags Amendment Act 1998, Flags Amendment Act 1981, Statute Law Revision Act 1973, Flags Act 1954
- Status: Amended

The Flags Act 1953 is an act of the Parliament of Australia which defines the official Australian National Flag and the Australian Red Ensign. Other flags may also be proclaimed as official flags of Australia under this act; for example, the Australian Aboriginal flag and the Australian Defence Force ensign.

== History ==
In the decades following the Federation of Australia in 1901 the Red Ensign was the pre-eminent flag in use by private citizens on land. This was largely due to the Commonwealth Government and flag suppliers restricting sales of the blue ensign to the general public. By traditional British understanding, the blue ensign was reserved for official government use. State and local governments, private organisations and individuals were expected to use the red ensign.

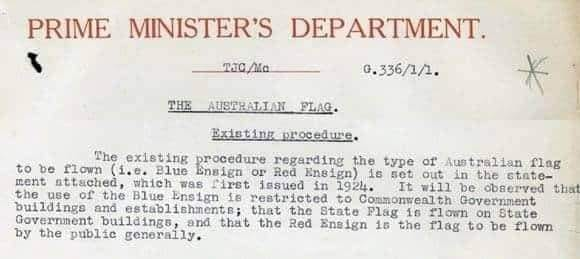
Extract of memo from the Prime Minister's Department dated 6 March 1939 concerning flag flying procedures.

In the 1920s there was debate over whether the blue ensign was reserved for Commonwealth buildings only, culminating in a 1924 agreement that the Union Flag should take precedence as the National Flag and that state and local governments were henceforth able to use the blue ensign. A memo from the Prime Minister of Australia's Department dated 6 March 1939 stated: "the Red Ensign is the flag to be flown by the public generally" and the federal government policy was "The flying of the Commonwealth Blue Ensign is reserved for Commonwealth Government use but there is no reservation in the case of the Commonwealth Merchant Flag, or Red Ensign".

In 1940 the Victorian government passed legislation allowing schools to purchase blue ensigns. The following year prime minister Robert Menzies issued a media release recommending that the blue ensign be flown at schools, government buildings and by private citizens and continued use of the red ensign by merchant ships, providing it was done so respectfully. Prime Minister Ben Chifley issued a similar statement in 1947.

On 4 December 1950, Menzies affirmed the Blue ensign as the National flag, and in 1951 King George VI approved the government's recommendation.

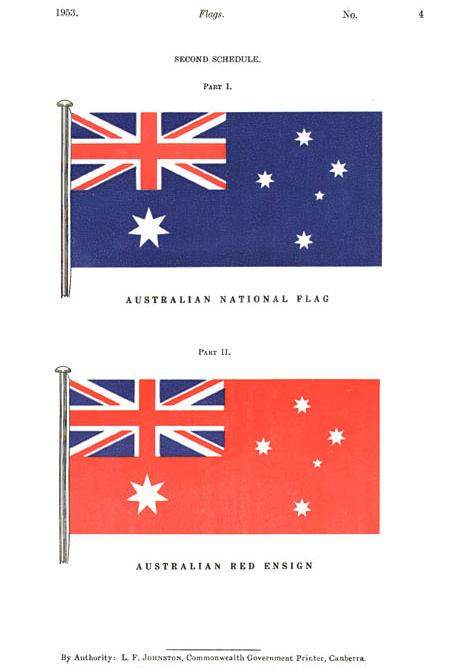
Second schedule to the Flags Act 1953.

When the Flags Bill was introduced into parliament on 20 November 1953, Menzies said: "This bill is very largely a formal measure which puts into legislative form what has become almost the established practice in Australia... The design adopted was submitted to His Majesty King Edward VII, and he was pleased to approve of it as the Australian flag in 1902. However, no legislative action has ever been taken to determine the precise form of the flag or the circumstances of its use, and this bill has been brought down to produce that result."

Queen Elizabeth II gave royal assent to the Flags Act 1953 on 14 February 1954 after opening the Commonwealth Parliament during her 1954 Royal Tour. It was the first of the few Commonwealth statutes enacted by the reigning monarch.

In 1995, the Australian Aboriginal flag and the Torres Strait Islander flag were proclaimed official flags of Australia under section 5 of the Act.

== Description of the Act ==
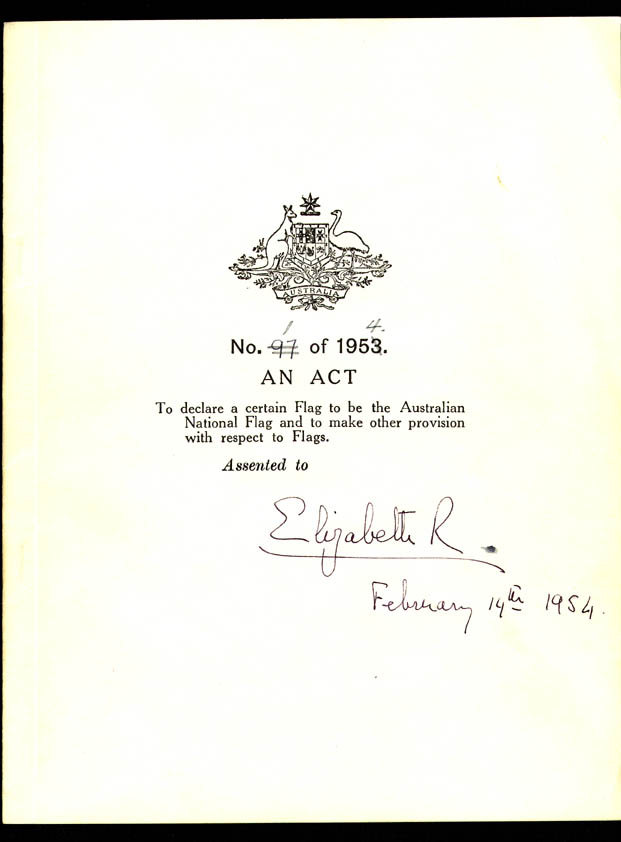
The cover of the Flags Act, featuring the signature of Queen Elizabeth II

The act specifies the colours and construction details for the Australian National Flag and the Australian Red Ensign (also known as the Australian Merchant Flag). Sections 5 & 6 confer statutory powers on the Governor-General to appoint 'flags and ensigns of Australia', and authorise warrants and make rules as to use of flags. Section 8 ensures that the 'right or privilege' of a person to fly the Union Jack is not affected by the Act.

The Act originally contained a serious drafting error in Table A of the Act. The outer diameter of the Commonwealth Star was recorded as being three-eighths of the width of the flag, instead of the true value of three-tenths of the width of the flag. The Act was amended to correct the error in 1954.

== Flags Amendment Act 1998 ==
The Flags Amendment Act 1998 was passed after the 1996 Australian federal election, during a period where republicanism and other debates about Australian national identity were prominent. The Flags Amendment Act 1998 added to section 3 of the Flags Act and provided that the present Australian National Flag could only be replaced if a majority of State and Territory electors qualified to vote for the House of Representatives agree. It was promoted by its supporters as "ensuring a degree of protection for" and "the first substantive parliamentary steps towards defining a process for the change of" the Australian National Flag.

=== Parliamentary debate ===
During parliamentary debate in the House of Representatives over the Flags Amendment Bill 1996, Laurie Ferguson MP, Member for Reid, whilst supporting the legislation, raised concerns that, "whilst the bill cements the idea of a plebiscite, with people being consulted in a manner similar to the consultation on the change to the national anthem, one of the weaknesses of the bill is that it does not set out any long-term process for the consideration of change." Referring to the fact that a future parliament may rescind or even ignore the amendment "in theory, it is not quite what it is cracked up to be in so far as, theoretically, a new government can alter it at any stage".
