= Australian Federation Flag =

Proposed national flag made in the 1830s

The Australian Federation Flag, also known as the New South Wales Ensign, was the result of an attempt in the 1830s to create a national flag for Australia, which was divided at the time into several British colonies.

Captain Jacob Gronow, Harbour Master of Port Jackson (Sydney), proposed the flag in 1831 in The NSW Calendar and Post Office Gazette; Gronow also designed the flag, which was based on the Colonial Flag of 1823.

Like the Colonial Flag, the Federation Flag features a combination of the Union Flag and the Southern Cross, but the cross is blue, not red, and there are five stars, not four. The flag's appearance varied greatly depending on where it was made: different manufacturers produced Federation Flags with darker or lighter shades of blue for the cross background; using five-pointed stars instead of eight; or positioning the stars in different places.

The Eureka Flag, flown by rebels at the Eureka Stockade in 1854, was reportedly influenced by designs such as the Federation flag.

While the Federation Flag proved popular and was widely used on the East Coast of Australia for over 70 years, it was never officially adopted. It was especially popular among proponents of Australian Federation and was also used as an unofficial ensign by the merchant marine. In 1884, Lord Derby of the Colonial Office banned the use of the Flag at sea, possibly because of its similarity to the White Ensign.

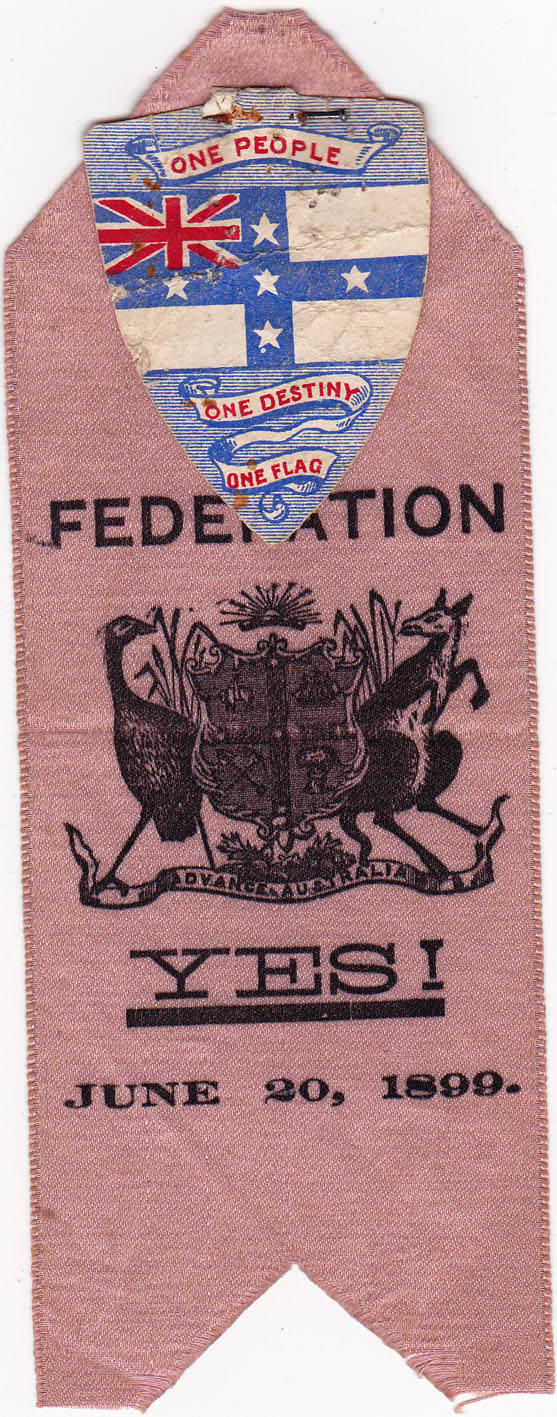
A ribbon produced in Sydney

In the 1880s and early 1890s, it was used as a symbol of the political movement towards Federation, with groups like the Australian Natives' Association and the Australian Federation League using it to promote national consciousness of their push for Federation, under the slogan "One People, One Destiny, One Flag".

The flag was a favourite of Australia's first Prime Minister, Sir Edmund Barton, who asked that a variant be considered for approval along with the competition-winning Blue Ensign. The Colonial Office rejected the Federation Flag, issuing Barton a mild rebuke. The Australian government received approval to fly the Blue Ensign in 1903, but the Australian Federation Flag was still being flown by Australian citizens as late as the 1920s.

It was formerly used in Sydney Central Railway Station's main hall. The now defunct nationalist Fraser Anning's Conservative National Party used the Australian Federation Flag as a shield in its logo.

== See also ==
- List of Australian flags
