= Brunswick South Primary School =

Location
- Brunswick East, Victoria; Australia
- Coordinates: 37°46′44″S 144°58′23″E

Information
- Type: Public, co-educational
- Motto: Imparare insieme, Creare insieme, Vivere insieme
- Established: 1886
- Principal: Kristie Satilmis
- Enrolment: 328
- Campus: Inner-suburban
- Colour: Pink
- Website: www.brunswicksouthps.vic.edu.au

Brunswick South Primary School (BSPS) is a government primary school located in Brunswick East, a suburb of Melbourne, Victoria, Australia.

The school was ear-marked by the Kennett state-government in the 1990s to be sold-off as being excess to requirements. The local community fought a strong campaign to successfully save the school.

The school's Victorian and Edwardian buildings are a significant landmark on Brunswick Road and are protected by a Heritage Overlay (HO35) in the Moreland Planning Scheme.

Brunswick South Primary School is an English Italian bilingual school.

== History ==
Due to rapidly increasing population in Brunswick and Carlton North, the Victorian Education Department purchased land for a school in Brunswick Road in 1873; only a decade later schools in the area were declared full. It opened as South Brunswick State School on 1 May 1886. It was a 2-storey brick building, with 6 rooms and a headmaster's office, and designed to accommodate 498 children. Although 967 pupils were enrolled, the average attendance during the first year was 491 students. However, within nine months the new school had to turn 14 prospective pupils away. In June 1888 some small brick additions, including a caretaker's residence were added, though with an enrolment of more than 800 children, there was an ongoing accommodation problem. On 22 April 1914 an Infant School building intended to accommodate 400 children was opened to the east of the main block, which became known as the 'little school'.

In 1933 a Rural Training School was established at the school by the Melbourne Teacher's College, to provide newly graduating teachers with experience prior to being posted in the bush. There was also an Opportunity Grade which was intended to meet the needs of 'backward' children and focused on practical tasks and manual skills. Traditional discipline (the strap for boys) was used at the school until 1982 when corporal punishment was abolished by the government.

After 1946, grades 7 and 8 were phased out, though it wasn't until 31 January 1970 that the name of the school was changed to Brunswick South Primary School. By 1947 enrolments at South Brunswick had declined to 616 pupils, and by 1965, this had fallen to 455. Since its earliest days, the school population included a small number of children from non-English speaking, non-Protestant backgrounds, but in the late 1940s, this element of diversity was dramatically increased by the arrival of thousands of European refugees to Australia. Brunswick in particular attracted large numbers of Italians and Greeks in the 1950s and 1960s, followed by Yugoslavs, Turks, Lebanese and Vietnamese. By 1967, enrolments were on the way up again at 577, and the principal of the time, William Pitts, drew up new policies aimed to adjust the school to meet the needs of its increasingly diverse students.

However, the late 1960s and early 1970s were hard times for the school, as there were increasing maintenance issues, staffing problems, high truancy and behavioural problems and a lack of community participation in school affairs. Despite the school council creating designated positions for parents representing the major ethnic groups, participation was minimal. By 1975 enrolments were down to 350. This state of affairs produced an extraordinary upsurge in efforts to engage the community by school staff, who visited all of the students' families in their own time. The school council was given expanded powers and increased representation followed. By 1981, the Education Department's District Inspector wrote in his review of BSPS: 'Best example of school, community support in area. As close to a community-based school as can be in the area.' The enrolment was now down to 186 pupils, and by the centenary celebrations of 1986, there were only 100 students at the school.

== Campus ==
By the 1880s, Brunswick and Lee Street Primary schools were at full capacity, a site for another Brunswick school had been sought, with North Carlton and South Brunswick growing rapidly.

The main building of the school, a two-storey brick structure was designed under H R Bastow, a prominent member of the Plymouth Brethren the Chief Architect of the Public Works Department.

The School's historical significance derives from technical, cultural and social factors. Firstly, it demonstrates Brunswick's rapid of growth pattern in the 1880s and ways of building developed for constrained inner-city cites. It also illustrates changes in school standards and teaching practices as well as showing the influence of the Brunswick community in achieving the standard of education they sought.

It is a large Gothic style building. It was the last of eleven schools which developed towards a distinct two storeyed central block between 1877–86, the building is recognisable for its high pitched slate roof, pointed arches, and clusters of tall octagonal chimneys and quatrefoils.

== School community ==
The school has established links with CERES and the Moreland Council in an effort to make the school environmentally sustainable. The school is accredited for international students, and is funded for specialist teaching aides for students with disabilities.

== Alumni ==
- Sir Kenneth Luke
- Russell Charles Hitchcock, Australian vocalist with Air Supply
