= Carlton Association =

Australian community action group

The Carlton Association was a community action group that campaigned on behalf of residents of the suburb of Carlton in Melbourne, Australia, between the years 1969 and 1993. The group was involved in protests against some of the most controversial redevelopment plans in the city’s history and was arguably the most politically successful residents’ action group that Melbourne has seen.

== Beginnings ==
The Association was formed in March 1969 by residents of Carlton and neighbouring Carlton North, in order to mobilise opposition to the Housing Commission of Victoria's (HCV) plans to redevelop large tracts of the two suburbs under its program of slum clearance. The HCV had long considered much of the housing stock of the inner suburbs of Melbourne to be unfit for habitation. The Commission’s modus operandi involved the compulsory acquisition of dwellings in a designated block, the wholesale demolition of these, and construction of high-rise flats of public housing. The commission flats, as they are known to locals, feature prominently in the skyline of Melbourne’s inner suburbs to this day. The first such complex of high-rise Commission flats in Carlton, announced in 1957, was constructed in the block bordered by Lygon, Rathdowne, Princes and Neill Streets. Despite vocal protests by residents whose houses were ‘reclaimed’ to make way for this development, the response from the Commission to these and other voices of opposition was invariably that ‘broader community goals must take preference over individual interests’.

When additional plans to redevelop 291 acres (1.18 km^{2}) of Carlton emerged in the mid-1960s, a group of Carlton traders published a vociferous pamphlet attacking the proposal under the title “HANDS OFF CARLTON”. Whilst the long-term goal of the Commission was to redevelop this entire block of land, the Commissioners focused their immediate attention on a smaller parcel of land within this selected area: the block bounded by Lee, Lygon, Princes and Drummond Streets in Carlton North, containing nineteenth century terrace housing. However, this proposal was met with significantly more opposition from locals, who, this time around, were able to organise themselves effectively.

== First meeting ==
The first public meeting of what would become the Carlton Association was held on 17 March 1969 at St Michael’s Hall in Princes Hill. It was attended by 170 Carltonians who heard fiery speeches from residents whose homes were threatened. The meeting concluded with the election of a ten-person committee and a plan for action. The Committee decided upon an organisational structure that would best enable the Association to address the central concerns of residents. In addition to three permanent sub-committees (architecture and town planning, community services and education), action groups would be established to respond to urgent concerns. The first of these action groups got to work immediately on the most pressing matter: the proposed demolition of the Lee Street block.

The action group prepared the case for preserving the existing buildings in a report addressed to the Commission. This report contained a comprehensive analysis of the block, demonstrating the historical significance and structural soundness of the buildings, the acceptable level of sanitation and the lack of ‘overcrowding’. It argued that there were no reasonable grounds upon which the houses could be demolished. Moreover, it challenged the HCV to prove that the area constituted a slum. The Carlton Association represented the views of many Melburnians in its warning to the Commission that “posterity will be justifiably angry if we permit destruction of this and similar areas – destruction of the historic heart of Melbourne.” However, the Commissioners were unable to see it this way, convinced as they were that the condition of ‘slum areas’ that had shocked the public during the Depression could never be rehabilitated.

== Compulsory acquisition and black bans ==
Once the occupants of the Lee Street block were served with compulsory acquisition notices, members of the Association intensified their efforts. They visited distraught residents and pleaded with them not to capitulate, and also held ‘open days’, whereby they invited people to tour the houses and observe their condition. ‘These are not slums!’ became the rallying slogan of the movement. The action group was also able to secure broader support from both the National Trust (which classified eleven homes in the block as historically significant) and the Union movement. The Builders Labourers Federation announced a ‘black ban’ on the site on 26 June 1969, which forbade its members from participating in either the demolition of the existing houses, or any subsequent redevelopment on the site. Eventually, the Carlton Association prevailed, and the wholesale demolition of the Lee Street block was averted. Several individual dwellings were replaced, but most of the Victorian fabric was to remain intact.

Over the following two-and-a-half decades, the Association was involved in numerous other battles to preserve the historic built fabric of the suburb against external threats, such as the proposal in 1971 to extend the F19 Freeway through Carlton, which would have necessitated demolition of houses and encouraged a major increase in traffic volumes through the area. Throughout its history, the Association also campaigned for improved educational facilities and better provision of community services, particularly in the areas of child care, aged care and immigrant services.

== Association's legacy ==
The Carlton Association ceased to exist in 1993, as many of its original members were battle-weary and wanted to pursue other interests. Nevertheless, the Carlton Association has left Melbourne with a significant legacy, which has been interpreted in several ways. Founding members believe that the group’s success was due to a coincidence of factors in Melbourne during the 1960s and 70s. At this time, there was a renewed appreciation of the historic and architectural value of Carlton’s Victorian-era housing, spearheaded by the increasing number of young professionals and academics who were purchasing terraces in the suburb and restoring and renovating them. It was also an era of protest and direct action – a period in which citizens were questioning the authority of public decision-makers.

Other commentators have seen the actions of the Carlton Association as linked to the gentrification of the suburb during the same period. As in other parts of inner Melbourne, the gentrification process in Carlton has resulted in a decline of the social mix once present, as escalating property prices have displaced poorer residents.

The Association also provided a successful model for community action groups which sprung up in Melbourne during the 1990s, such as the Carlton Residents Association and Save Our Suburbs.

== Criticisms ==
The Carlton Association has been heavily criticized for not allowing the widening Macarthur Ave to match that of Elliot avenue through Royal park and associated roads, and the general widening of the roads connecting them to Princess st and Eastern Freeway. Also the diverting of traffic through some of the back streets of Carlton using One way signs and Speed humps to reduce traffic flow for residents, which has been attributed to more traffic congestion on surrounding roads during peak hour.
