= PHSC =

PHSC may refer to:

- Pasco–Hernando State College, Florida, United States
- Pickerington High School Central, Ohio, United States
- Princes Hill Secondary College, Melbourne, Australia
- Public Health Services Cluster, in the Philippines Department of Health
- Pluripotential hemopoietic stem cell, in the process of haematopoiesis
