= Princes Hill Secondary College =

Coordinates: 37°47′02″S 144°57′52″E

Location
- Arnold Street, Princes Hill; Melbourne, Victoria, 3054; Australia

Information
- Type: co-educational government school
- Motto: Latin: Labore et fide
- Established: 1889
- Principal: Trevor Smith
- Years offered: 7–12
- Enrollment: 850
- Website: phsc.vic.edu.au

Princes Hill Secondary College is a coeducational state secondary school, located in Princes Hill, an inner suburb of Melbourne, Victoria, Australia. The school is 2 kilometres from the Melbourne City Centre.

The school was formerly known as Princes Hill High School and prior to that, Princes Hill Central School. Princes Hill Secondary College is non-selective and accepts students from over 30 primary schools in the City of Yarra, City of Melbourne, City of Merri-bek and City of Darebin.

== History ==
The school was opened by the acting headmaster on 2 September 1889 with several hundred pupils. It was the continuation of the Lygon Street, North Carlton school, established in the 1860s.

Ivor Evans, a 13-year-old student at Princes Hill State School, was a co-winner of the 1901 Federal Flag Design Competition to design Australia's national flag. It was displayed over the Royal Exhibition Building.

A fire destroyed the original structure on 8 February 1970. Teachers at the school sent a telegram to the then prime minister, John Gorton, to ask for financial aid for the school. 410 pupils were left without classrooms.

The school was rebuilt in 1973 by Daryl Jackson in a Brutalist architectural style. New wings have been added since 1983, and a gymnasium in the 2000s

The school has a no-uniform policy. Students have not worn uniforms since 1971.

== Campus ==
Princes Hill Secondary College is one of the few late-20th-century buildings on Arnold Street.

In 2005, parts of the school were refurbished: the performing arts centre, textiles and food facilities, year 11 and 12 classrooms and science laboratories. A gymnasium was later established in 2006.

The school has small theatre seating 150 and a camp near Mirimbah, located at the foothills of Mount Buller in the Victorian Alps.

== Academics ==
VCE studies offered by the school:
Art, Australian and Global Politics, Biology, Business Management, Chemistry, Classical Studies, Drama, English, English (EAL), English Language, Foundation Mathematics, French, Further Mathematics, General Mathematics, Global Politics, Health and Human Development, History: 20th Century (1900-1945), History: 20th Century (since 1945), History: Revolutions, Italian, Literature, Mathematical Methods (CAS), Media, Music Investigation, Music Performance, Philosophy, Physical Education, Physics, Product Design and Technology, Psychology, Specialist Mathematics, Studio Arts and Visual Communication Design.

In 2008 and 2012 VCE Media and Art students' work was selected for the Top Arts Exhibition at the National Gallery of Victoria.

Princes Hill Secondary College was ranked in the top 200 public secondary schools (equal 9th) in Australia based on academic results in 2009.

In 2013, 32 of 111 students achieved an Australian Tertiary Admission Rank over 90 (29%), almost 50% of students achieved over 80, and 67% achieved over 70.

In 2014, the Victorian Certificate of Education median study score was 33. 16.4 percent of students achieved over 40 study scores.

Princes Hill Secondary College was ranked 14th out of all state secondary schools in Victoria based on VCE results in 2018.

== Notable alumni ==
- Attila Abonyi, Australian association football player, member of the Australia national association football team for the 1974 FIFA World Cup
- Rupert Balfe, Australian rules footballer
- Steve Bastoni, Australian actor
- Donna Benjamin, Australian open source community contributor, commentator and advocate
- Tony Birch, Indigenous Australian author, academic and activist
- John Bluthal, British film and television actor
- Jack Brake, Australian football player
- Arnold Briedis, Australian rules footballer
- Lily Brett, Australian novelist, essayist and poet
- Sir William Brunton, Australian politician, and Lord Mayor of Melbourne
- Vin Catoggio, Australian rules footballer
- Kelvin Coe OBE, Australian ballet dancer of the Australian Ballet
- Alan Crawford, Australian rules footballer
- Amiel Daemion, singer
- Matt Day, Australian actor
- John Dugdale, Australian rules footballer
- Geoffrey Edelsten, Australian medical entrepreneur, philanthropist, former owner of the Sydney Swans
- Brandon Ellis, Australian rules footballer
- Ivor William Evans, Australian co-designer of the Australian flag
- Fred Freer, Australian cricketer
- Mikey Goldsworthy, Australian bassist for Years & Years
- Jack Hale, Australian rules footballer
- Bob Heatley, Australian rules footballer
- Russell Hitchcock, Australian singer
- Spiro Kourkoumelis, Australian rules footballer
- Ben Lewin, Australian-American film director and screenwriter
- Sam Lipski, Australian journalist
- Ian Macfarlan, Australian politician, deputy leader of the Liberal Party of Australia in the state of Victoria, and the 35th Premier of Victoria
- Gulliver McGrath, Australian actor
- Paul Meldrum, Australian rules footballer
- Gretta Ray, Australian singer-songwriter (graduated 2016)
- Angourie Rice, Australian actress starring in Mean Girls (2024), The Nice Guys, Nowhere Boys: The Book of Shadows and Spider-Man: Homecoming (graduated 2018)
- Adam Richard, Australian comedian, actor and media personality
- Wendy Saddington, Australian blues, soul and jazz singer
- Sir David Smith KCVO, AO, Australian public servant
- Maria Vamvakinou, Australian politician, ALP member for Calwell in the Parliament of Australia
- Frank Warne, Australian cricketer
- David White, Former Australian politician
- Arnold Zable, Australian writer
