= Norm Henderson =

Australian rules footballer (1901–1968)

Personal information
- Full name: Norman Marshall Henderson
- Born: 7 March 1901; Carlton North, Victoria
- Died: 7 January 1968 (aged 66); South Melbourne, Victoria

Playing career^{1}
Years	Club	Games (Goals)
1920	Melbourne	2 (2)
- ^{1} Playing statistics correct to the end of 1920.

Norman Marshall Henderson (7 March 1901 – 7 January 1968) was an Australian rules footballer who played with Melbourne in the Victorian Football League (VFL).

== Family ==
The son of George Henry Henderson (1873-1923), and Sarah Ann Henderson (1872-1929), née Marshall, Norman Marshall Henderson was born at Carlton North, Victoria on 7 March 1901.

He married Alma Edith Burrows (1906-1960) in 1936.

== Football ==
=== Melbourne (VFL) ===
He played in two First XVIII matches for Melbourne in 1920.

=== Hawthorn (VFA) ===
On 3 May 1922, he was cleared from Melbourne to the Hawthorn football club, then competing in the VFA.

== Death ==
He died on 7 January 1968.
