= Annie Dorrington =

Australian artist (1866–1926)

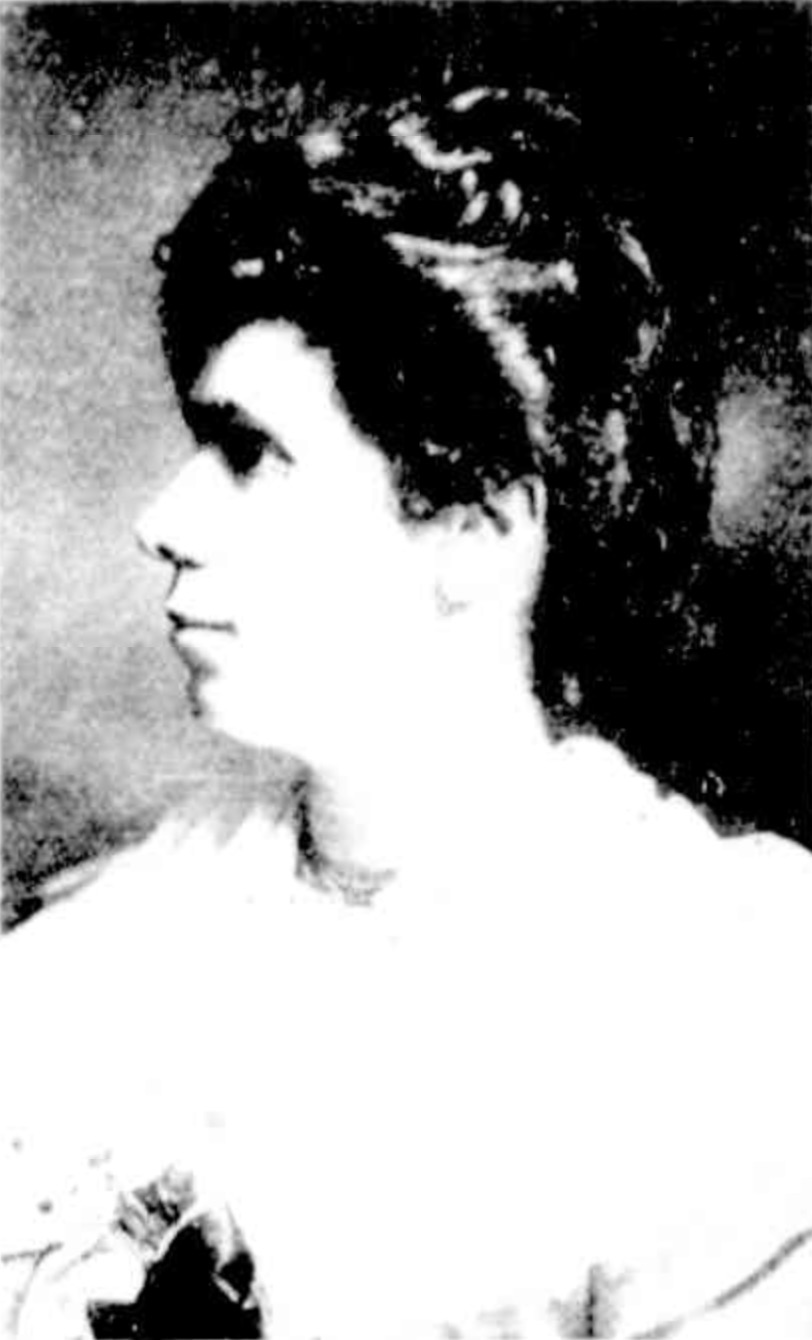
Annie Dorrington in 1901

Annie Dorrington (19 March 1866 – 21 April 1926) was an Australian artist who was known for her wildflower paintings and watercolours. She is also one of the designers of the Australian flag.

== Early life ==
On 19 March 1866, Annie Whistler was born in Litchfield Ashe, near Southampton, England. She was the second of nine children of Richard Whistler and his wife, Sarah Mills (née Vines); she had six sisters and two brothers. Richard was a tenant farmer on the Foliejon Estate and farm in Winkfield, Berkshire; her father was a distant relative of the artist James McNeill Whistler, but this has not been proven. The farm adjoined Windsor Great Park, and Annie and her sisters sometimes saw Queen Victoria being driven through the park. Annie began painting in childhood, and she and her sisters enjoyed painting scenes on the banks of the Thames River.

Richard Whistler died in 1887, and a bailiff named Charles Dorrington, who later became Annie's husband, came to manage the farm. When the Whistler sisters asked their mother what their prospective bailiff's name was, she replied, "It could be Ahasuerus for all I know!" As a result, Charles Dorrington was known by the nickname 'Asu' from then on, and Annie later used 'Ahasuerus' as a pseudonym when she entered Australia's national flag competition (see below). In 1890, Sarah emigrated to Melbourne, Victoria, with all nine of her children. Charles Dorrington accompanied them, and in 1892 Charles and Annie were married in St. Alban's Church of England in Armadale, a suburb of Melbourne. Sarah had not wanted Annie to marry Dorrington and cut her off entirely as a result. Many years later, Annie's niece Kath Dowsing recalled that her name was never mentioned in the family. In 1895, Annie and Charles moved to Western Australia; they lived at Fremantle in 1897 before moving to Perth in 1898. Charles worked for the Swan River Shipping Company in Perth until 1914, after which he became a shire clerk at Mundijong. The Dorringtons had no children.

== Art career ==
It was after the Dorringtons moved to Perth that Annie became known as a painter who specialized in watercolours of Western Australian wildflowers. Her botanical paintings are for the most part moderately detailed and realistic, with some subjects painted in a more impressionistic style and with more vivid colours. The subjects are often sprays of flowers with their leaves, isolated against a plain background. Typical of the plants she chose to depict are Orthrosanthus laxus (a small flower commonly known as morning iris), Chamelaucium aorocladus (known as waxflower), and kangaroo paw. She gave some of her paintings to a friend, Alice Moore, who picked specimen flowers for her in Kings Park.

By 1901, Annie was exhibiting widely, with watercolours in the Western Australian pavilion at the 1900 Paris International Exhibition, the 1901 Glasgow International Exhibition, the 1904 St. Louis International Exposition, and the 1908 Franco-British Exhibition, London. The London show included no less than 50 of her paintings. She offered to sell some of them to Bernard Woodward, director of the Western Australian Museum and Art Gallery, but without success. To help support herself, Annie taught private painting classes at home from 1902 to 1906, advertising them in the local newspaper.

In 1901, using the pseudonym 'Ahasuerus', Annie entered the 1901 Federal Flag Design Competition to design a flag for Australia; hers was one of over 30,000 entries. She was the first named and only woman among the five entrants who submitted similar designs, all of which featured the constellation of the Southern Cross. She split a prize of £200 with the other four other winners: Ivor Evans (a schoolboy), Leslie John Hawkins (an apprentice optician), Egbert John Nuttall (an architect), and William Stevens (a ship's officer).

Suffering from depression, Annie had treatments at Claremont Mental Hospital for a few months in 1908 and again in 1918. In 1914, she and her husband moved to Serpentine, where Charles became a farmer and fruit grower. Annie died there of cancer in 1926 at the age of 60. Charles died nine years later, in 1935, and the following year 124 of Annie's paintings were donated to the Art Gallery of Western Australia. In 1991, her paintings were featured in a survey exhibition mounted by the gallery and subsequently reproduced in the resulting show catalogue.

Annie was buried in Karrakatta Cemetery in an initially unmarked grave. In October 1998, the Australian National Flag Association purchased the expired Grant of Right of Burial situated at Anglican MA 524. In 1999, in honour of her contributions to Australian culture, a new monument to Annie Dorrington was erected on her gravesite. The section in which Annie was buried was redeveloped (renewed) circa 2001 (now known as General ANMA), however, Annie's headstone was retained during the removal process. The grave's Grant of Right of Burial is set to expire on 21 October 2023, after which ownership and control of the grave will revert to the Metropolitan Cemeteries Board.
