= Ivor Evans =

Ivor Evans may refer to:

- I. H. N. Evans (Ivor Hugh Norman Evans, 1886–1957), British anthropologist, ethnographer and archaeologist
- Ivor Evans (Australian footballer) (1887–1960), Australian rules footballer
- Ivor William Evans (1887–1960), co-designer of the Australian national flag
- Ivor Evans (bishop) (1900–1962), Anglican bishop in South America
- Ivor Evans (opera singer, born William Ivor Evans 1911), (1911–1993), Welsh bass baritone singer
- Ivor Evans (footballer, born 1966), Fijian football midfielder

== See also ==
- Ifor Evans (disambiguation)
