= Ifor Evans =

Ifor Evans may refer to:

- Ifor Evans, Baron Evans of Hungershall (1899–1982), British academic and university administrator; provost of University College London
- Ifor Leslie Evans (1897–1952), Welsh academic; principal of the University College of Wales Aberystwyth

== See also ==
- Ivor Evans (disambiguation)
