= Brunswick East =

- Suburb
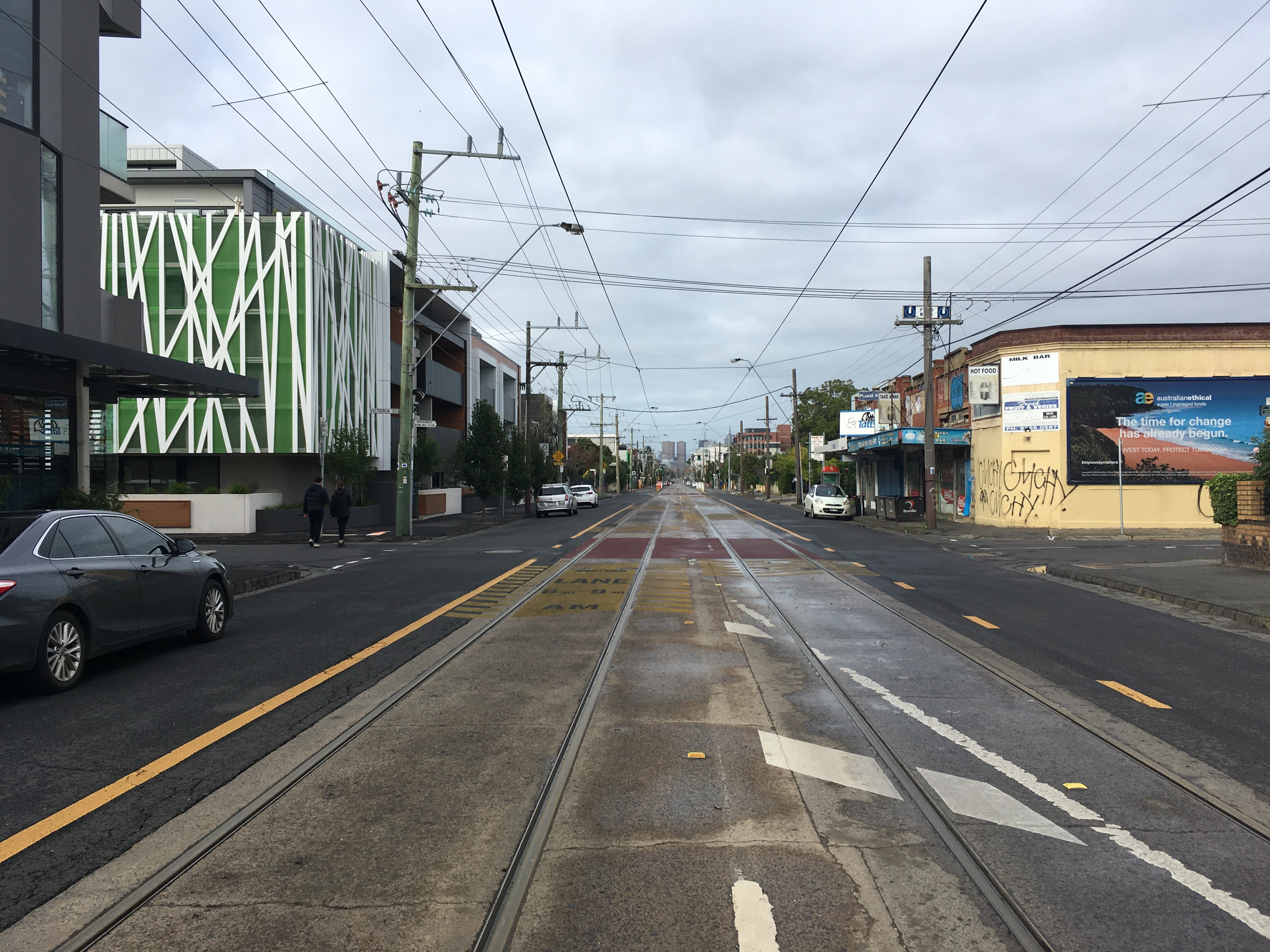
- Nicholson Street in Brunswick East

- Interactive map of Brunswick East
- Coordinates: 37.776°S 144.974°E
- Country: Australia
- State: Victoria
- City: Melbourne
- LGA: City of Merri-bek
- Location: 5 km (3.1 mi) N of Melbourne
- Established: 1839

Government
  - State electorate: Brunswick
  - Federal division: Wills

Area
  - Total: 2.2 km^{2} (0.85 sq mi)
- Elevation: 45 m (148 ft)

Population
  - Total: 13,279 (2021 census)
  - Density: 6,040/km^{2} (15,600/sq mi)
- Postcode: 3057
Suburbs around Brunswick East
Coburg	Coburg	Thornbury
Brunswick	Brunswick East	Northcote
Princes Hill	Carlton North	Fitzroy North

Brunswick East is an inner-city suburb in Melbourne, Victoria, Australia, 5 km (3.1 mi) north of Melbourne's Central Business District, located within the City of Merri-bek local government area. Brunswick East recorded a population of 13,279 at the 2021 census.

Bordered generally by Lygon Street and Holmes Street in the west; the Merri Creek in the east adjoining Northcote; Park Street, Nicholson Street and Glenlyon Road in the south adjoining Carlton North and Fitzroy North; and Moreland Road in the north adjoining Coburg. Brunswick East is a mixed-use suburb, consisting of primarily residential and commercial properties.

== Geography ==
Lygon Street and Nicholson Street run along Brunswick East's western border with neighbouring Brunswick, while Park Street (one block south of the main thoroughfare of Brunswick Road) and Glenlyon Road form the southern border with Carlton North and Fitzroy North respectively. Merri Creek marks the eastern border with adjoining Northcote. Moreland Road marks the northern border with adjoining Coburg.

Brunswick East has a hillier landscape than Brunswick.

== History ==
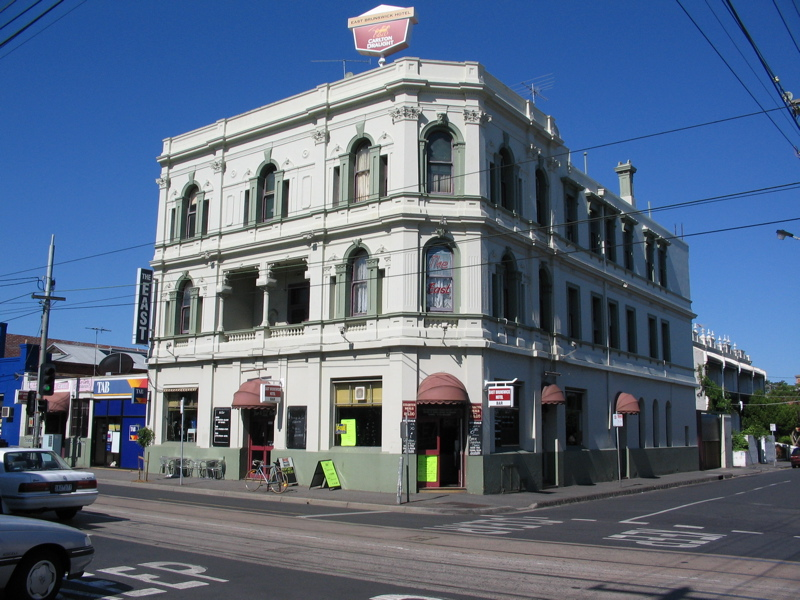
East Brunswick Hotel, built in 1880

In 1839, under the instructions of Robert Hoddle, chief surveyor, the area of Brunswick, including East Brunswick, was surveyed. Big blocks were marked out of 1 1/2 miles long by 1/4-mile wide. The blocks were bought mostly by land speculators.

Bluestone quarrying was one of the first industries in Brunswick East. By 1852, the local stone quarries had been worked to the point of exhaustion.

Significant residential subdivision of the area took place in the 1880s (Brunswick East Post Office opening on 13 January 1888) and also in the period after World War I. In 1916, the tram along Lygon Street was electrified, making access much easier.

Brunswick's first textile factory, Prestige Hosiery, opened in 1922, and the suburb became the location of numerous textile and garment factories. The textile industry has been in substantial decline in the suburb since the 1980s, with the liberalisation and elimination of tariff controls by successive Federal Governments.

Redevelopment of commercial and industrial property has taken place for medium and high density housing, as part of the intense gentrification Brunswick East has been subjected to.

== Demographics ==
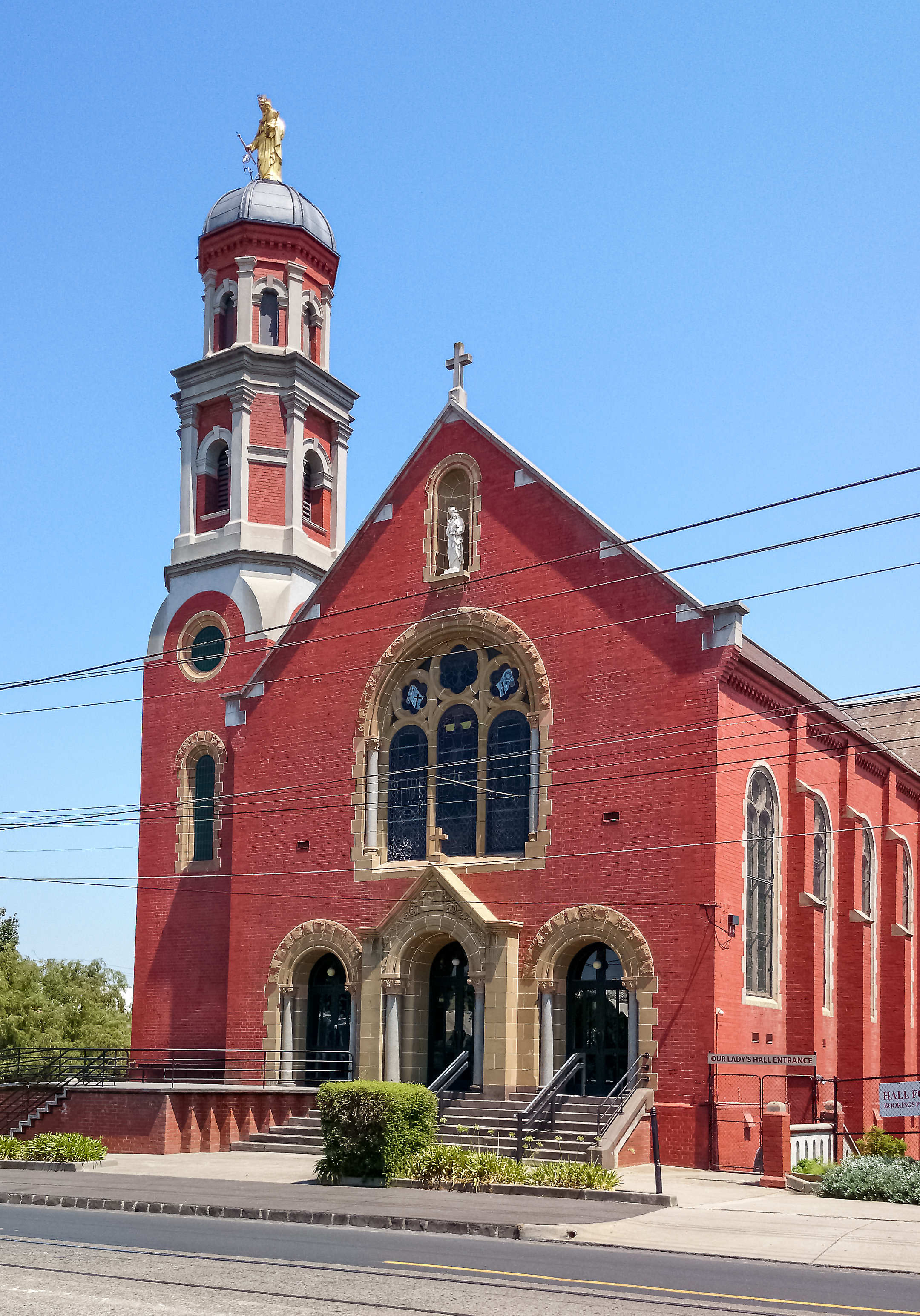
Our Lady Help Of Christians Catholic Church

According to the 2011 census, there were 8476 people were living in Brunswick East. The population rose from 7410 recorded in 2006, and 6845 in 2001.

The suburb has a higher proportion of people 18–34 years and a lower proportion of children 0–17 years and older people over 70 years, than the Merri-bek average. While cultural diversity is declining, nearly one third of all citizens were born overseas, which, although lower than the Merri-bek average, is substantially higher than the metropolitan average.

In the 2011 census, 65.5% of people reported speaking only English at home. The most common other languages spoken at home are Italian (9.2%), Greek (4.6%), Arabic (2.5%), Mandarin (1.8%) and Cantonese (1.0%). In the census, 39.4% of people identified as having no religion (markedly more than the state average of 24.0%), 26.5% as Catholic, 6.6% as Eastern Orthodox, 4.4% as Anglican and 2.8% as Buddhist.

Brunswick East has a high proportion of flats, units, apartments and semi-detached row townhouses. Separate houses make up just over half of all dwellings. More than one in four households in Brunswick East are lone person households and 14 per cent are group households, which is higher than the Merri-bek and metropolitan averages. There is also a high proportion of rental households, which is also significantly higher than the metropolitan and Merri-bek averages.

Residents of Brunswick East tend to be highly educated, with 28 per cent having a bachelor's degree or higher, and over half of all residents having completed Year 12 schooling, significantly higher than the municipal and metropolitan averages. A high proportion of professionals work in Brunswick East, with declining numbers of labourers, trades, production and transport workers. Income data from the 2001 census highlights that there are still pockets of disadvantage in the suburb, with almost half of the citizens on weekly individual incomes of less than $400 per week, with 10 per cent of citizens on incomes of less than $120 per week.

== Commerce and culture ==
At the southern end of the Brunswick East strip of Lygon Street there is an increasing diversity of restaurants and cafés offering a variety of cuisines including: Italian, Greek, Lebanese, Vietnamese, Japanese, Indian, Thai, and Malaysian foods. This restaurant strip is quite separate from the longer established "Little Italy" strip of restaurants and street cafés further south in Lygon Street, Carlton. At the northern end of the Brunswick East strip of Lygon Street is a neighbourhood strip with a mixture of community, retail and entertainment venues. Between the two, Lygon Street is predominantly light industrial buildings undergoing a process of redevelopment to mixed-use. The East Brunswick Club Hotel became popular in the mid-2000s as a music venue.

Community radio station 3RRR moved from Fitzroy to the corner Blyth and Nicholson Streets in late 2004, opposite another music venue, the Lomond Hotel.

== Transport ==
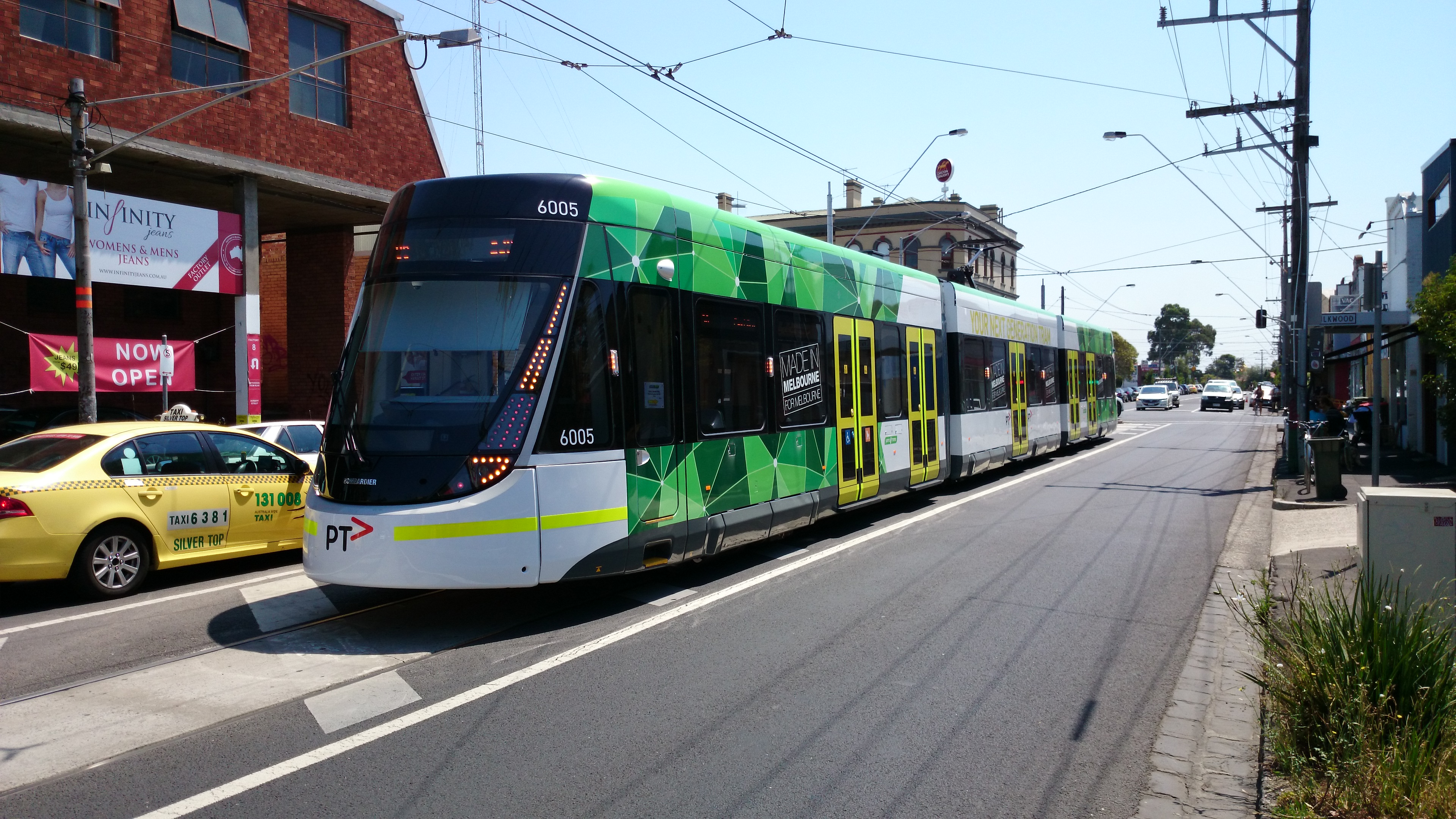
E 6005 tram at East Brunswick on route 96

Commuters to the city use bus and tram routes.

=== Bus ===
Five bus routes travel east–west through the suburb, including:

- 503 : Essendon station – East Brunswick via Brunswick West, Brunswick, Anstey station (Monday to Saturday). Operated by Dysons.
- 504 : Moonee Ponds Junction – Clifton Hill station via East Brunswick. Operated by Dysons.
- 506 : Moonee Ponds Junction – Westgarth station via Brunswick West, Brunswick, Fitzroy North, Northcote (Monday to Saturday). Operated by Dysons.
- 508 : Alphington station – Moonee Ponds Junction via Brunswick West, Brunswick station, Northcote, Fairfield (every day). Operated by Dysons.
- 510 : Essendon station – Ivanhoe station via Brunswick West, Moreland station, Thornbury, Fairfield (every day). Operated by Kinetic Melbourne.

=== Cycling ===
Cyclists have available many, on road cycle lanes as well as easy access to the Merri Creek Trail along Merri Creek. On the southern edge of the suburb, the old Inner Circle railway line is now a linear park which is a part of the Capital City Trail for pedestrians and cyclists. This trail connects the Merri Creek Trail to the Moonee Ponds Creek Trail in the network of pedestrian and bicycle shared use paths for Cycling in Melbourne.

=== Tram ===
Three tram routes service Brunswick East:

- travels from the terminus at Bell Street, Coburg East to South Melbourne Beach (via Swanston Street and University of Melbourne). It may be boarded on Holmes Street or Lygon Street in Brunswick East.
- travels from the terminus at Moreland Road/Cameron Street to Glen Iris via Swanston Street and Melbourne University. It may be boarded on Moreland Road, Holmes Street or Lygon Street in Brunswick East.
- travels from East Brunswick (Blyth Street/Nicholson Street) to St Kilda Beach (Acland Street) via Bourke Street. Catch it on Nicholson Street in Brunswick East. Some trams on this line (route number 96d) only travel from East Brunswick (Blyth Street/Nicholson Street) to the Southbank tram depot (Normanby Road).

== Landmarks ==
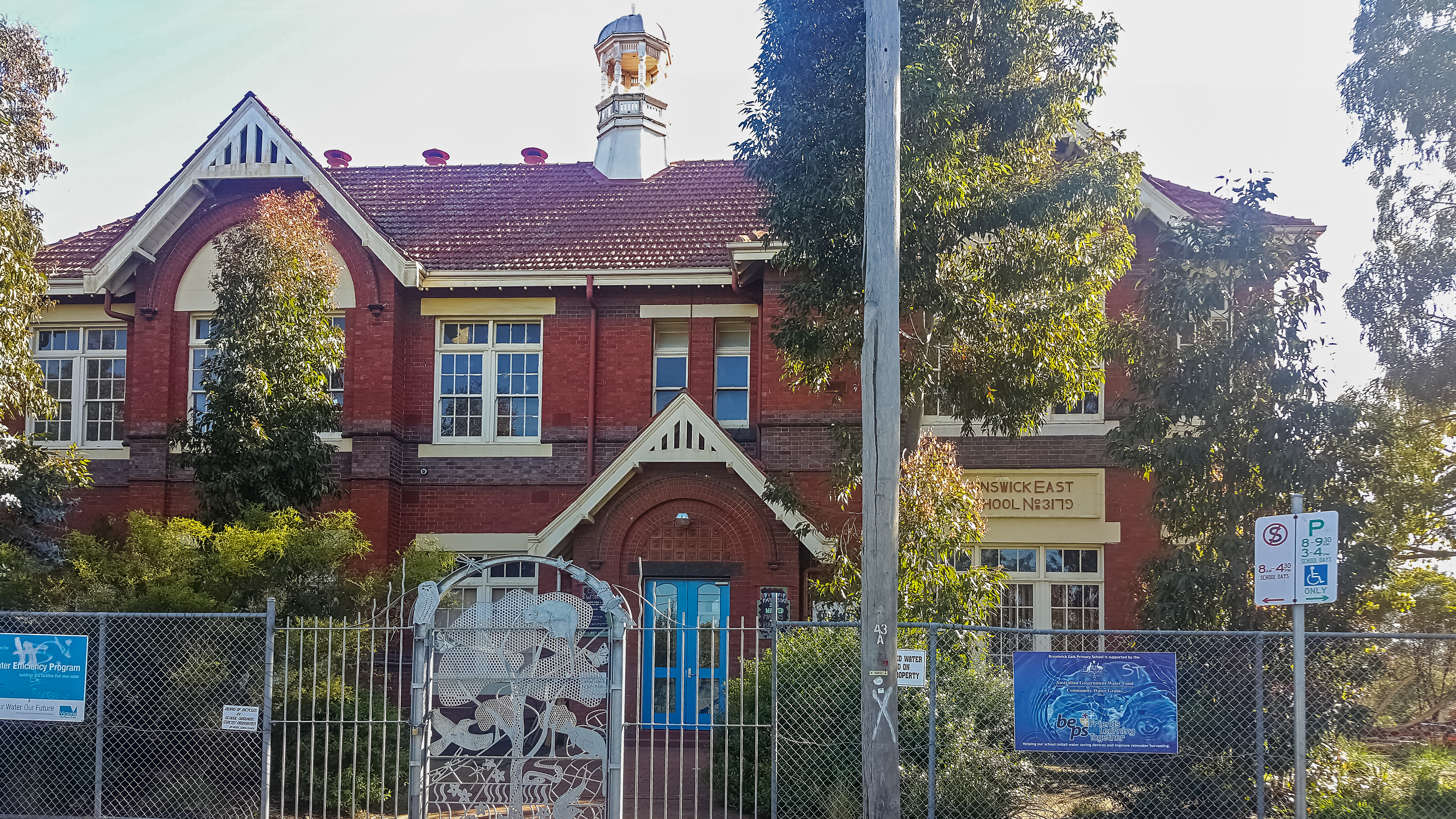
Brunswick East Primary School

- The CERES Community Environment Park (Centre for Education and Research in Environmental Strategies) is a 10-acre (40,000 m^{2}) urban environmental centre located in Brunswick East's eastern border.
- A long-standing landmark of the northern half of Brunswick East is the Brunswick East Primary School, Stewart Street, first established in 1893, which still retains the original bell tower construction and much of its overall core structure, plus necessary additions over the decades.
- The heritage-listed buildings at Brunswick South Primary School on Brunswick Road are a local landmark.
- A large yellow community building operated by the Cretan Brotherhood of Melbourne is found by the tram terminal at the end of Nicholson Street.

== Public open space ==
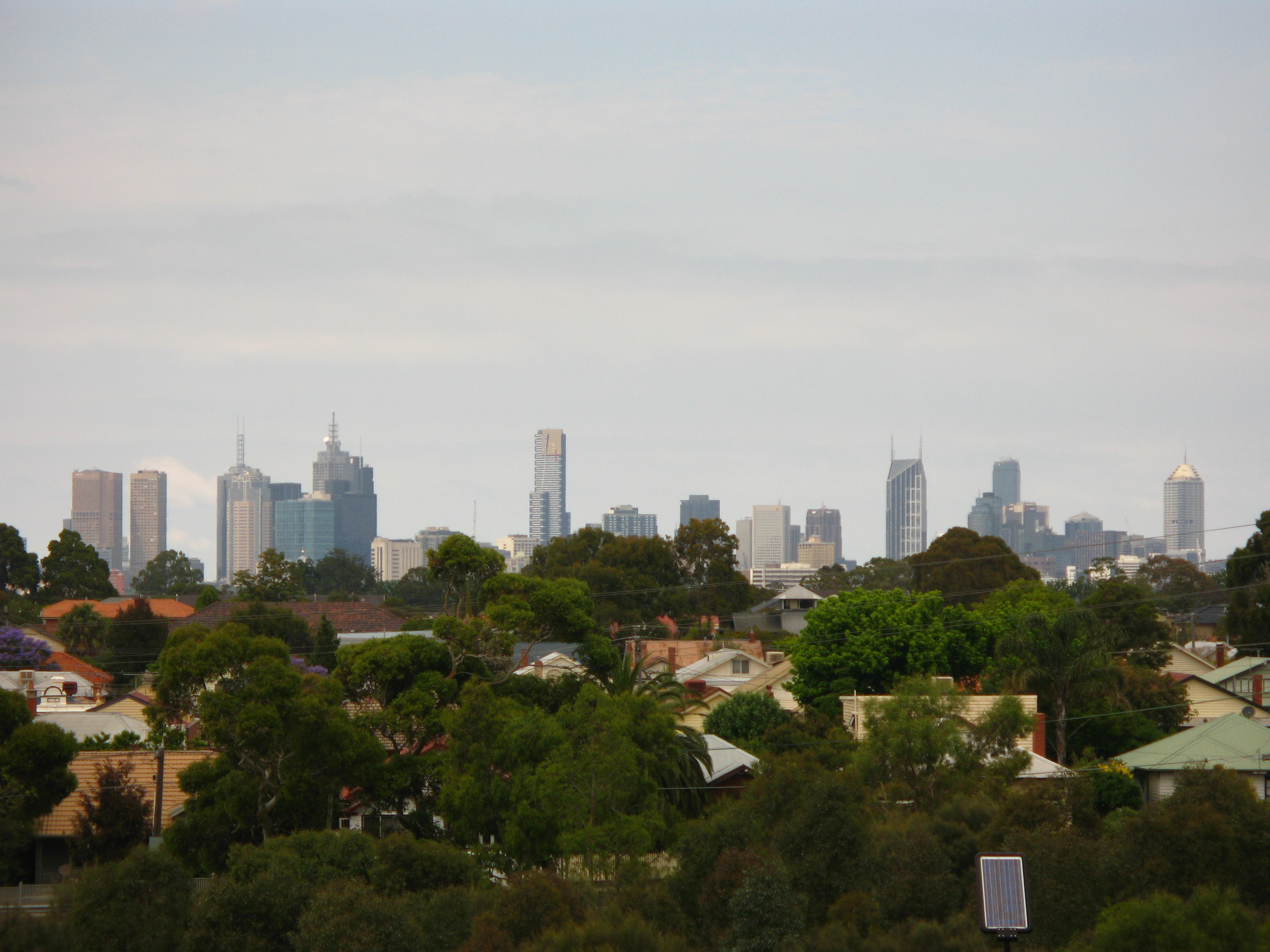
Houses in Brunswick east, looking towards Melbourne from Jones Park Hill

East Brunswick has several parks and reserves of varying size, as well as the Merri Creek corridor which is managed by a long-standing community group and has a popular bike path connected to the main Yarra Trail. The public open space forming part of the Merri Creek corridor or directly accessible from it includes:

- Allard Park (oval)
- Anderson Reserve
- Jones Park
- Roberts Reserve
- Brunswick Velodrome
- Sumner Park (small oval/soccer pitch)
- Merri Creek Reserve

Within the built-up area of East Brunswick, public open space includes:

- Fleming Park (including the Brunswick Bowling Club)
- Methven Park
- Fisher Reserve
- Balfe Park (soccer pitch)
- Douglas Reserve
- Park Street Reserve (not to be confused with Park Street Oval)

== Educational facilities ==
Brunswick East has two government primary schools, Brunswick East Primary School (BEPS) and Brunswick South Primary School (BSPS), and a Catholic primary school, Our Lady Help of Christians next to a Church of the same name. Northcote Secondary College is the nearest high school in Brunswick East. Brunswick East Primary School opened in 1893, and renovated in 1922, the early 1970s and 1997. CERES provides courses about environmental sustainability.

== Development issues ==
Brunswick East is an area in transition. Lygon Street and parts of Nicholson Street are its main activity centres, with a mix of commercial, retail, community and light industrial in the former, and a bias towards light industrial and residential in the latter. Rises in land values due to gentrification have resulted in many of the industrial uses vacating their buildings, which have become attractive to developers of medium and higher-density residential projects, often with a small commercial or retail component. Many of these projects have been contentious among the local community, the most notable being the East Brunswick Village development on Nicholson Street. Local groups such as the Brunswick Progress Association and the Brunswick Residents Network have been active in anti-development campaigns, along with the local branch of Save Our Suburbs, Brunswick Residents Against Inappropriate Development. In 2006, Moreland City Council commenced a consultative process to develop a Structure Plan for the Brunswick Major Activity Centre, whose study area incorporates Lygon Street, Nicholson Street and much of the adjoining suburb of Brunswick.

== Politics ==
Brunswick East was a part of the City of Brunswick local government area until the latter was amalgamated with councils to the north to form the City of Moreland (now City of Merri-bek) in 1994. The area has traditionally been considered an Australian Labor Party stronghold, although with recent demographic changes the area has contributed to the election of an Australian Greens Party Councillor to the Moreland Council in 2001, 2004, 2008, and again in 2012.

At federal level, Brunswick East is within the Division of Wills, held by Peter Khalil of the ALP since 2016. In the Victorian Legislative Assembly, Brunswick East lies within the Electoral district of Brunswick, which has been held by The Greens' Tim Read since the 2018 state election. For the 1999 state election, the suburb was in the Electoral district of Coburg. Polling place statistics are presented below combining the votes from the Brunswick East and Brunswick South East polling places in the federal and state elections as indicated.

Federal results

Election	First		Second		Third		Fourth		Fifth	
2013	Greens	40.1	Labor	33.3	Liberal	14.2	Independent	0.03	Sex Party	0.03
2010	Labor	42.0	Greens	37.6	Liberal	13.0	Socialist Alliance	1.3	Australian Democrats	0.7
2007	Labor	49.5	Greens	27.6	Liberal	15.7	Australian Democrats	1.8	Socialist Alliance	1.3
2004	Labor	48.3	Greens	24.6	Liberal	18.0	Socialist Alliance	1.6	Australian Democrats	1.5
2001	Labor	49.7	Greens	20.6	Liberal	15.35	Australian Democrats	5.9	Independent	1.7

State results (Two candidate preferred votes)

Election	First		Second	
2014	Greens	52.3	Labor	44.0
2010	Labor	47.7	Greens	47.3
2006	Greens	46.9	Labor	46.3
2002	Labor	79.0	Liberal	14.9
1999	Labor	72.9	Liberal	22.9

== Notable people ==
- Members of the band King Gizzard and the Lizard Wizard
- Terence James Elkins (born 8 March 1936) – Australian-born American physicist

== See also ==
- City of Brunswick – Brunswick East was previously within this former local government area.

== Notes ==
- Barnes, Les (1987). It Happened in Brunswick 1837–1987. Brunswick Community History Group. ISBN 0-9587742-0-X. (64 pages)
- Moreland City Council: Brunswick East Suburb Profile (2004)
