= 1901 Federal Flag Design Competition =

Contest for the design of the Australian flag

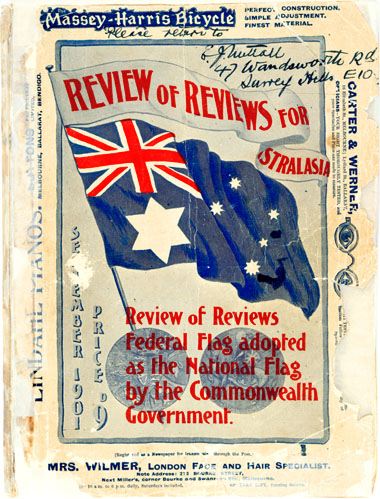
The edition of the Review of Reviews front cover signed by Egbert Nuttall, after the winning designers of the 1901 Federal Flag design competition were announced.

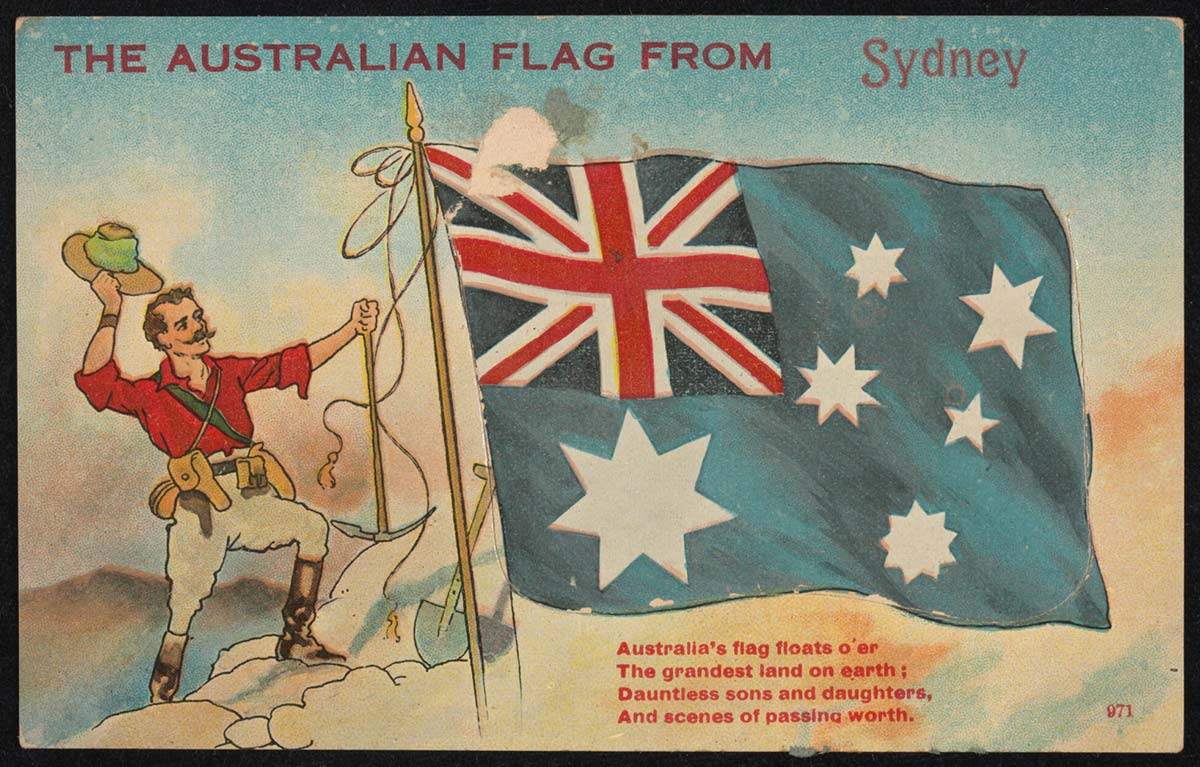
The Australian flag from Sydney’ postcard, 1905

The 1901 Federal Flag Design Competition was an Australian government initiative announced by Prime Minister Edmund Barton to find a flag for the newly federated Commonwealth of Australia. In terms of its essential elements the winning entries are the official flag of Australia.

== Background ==
After Federation on 1 January 1901 and following receipt of a request from the British government to design a flag to distinguish Australia, the new Commonwealth Government held an official competition for a new 'federal flag' in April. The competition attracted 32,823 entries, including those originally sent to the one held earlier by the Review of Reviews. One of these was submitted by an unnamed governor of a colony. The two contests were merged after the Review of Reviews agreed to being integrated into the government initiative. The £75 prize money of each competition were combined and augmented by a further £50 donated by Havelock Tobacco Company.

== Conditions of entry ==
Each competitor was required to submit two coloured sketches, a red ensign for public use, and a blue ensign for official use. The designs were judged on seven criteria: loyalty to the Empire, Federation, history, heraldry, distinctiveness, utility and cost of manufacture. The majority of designs incorporated the Union Flag and the Southern Cross, but native animals were also popular, including one that depicted a variety of indigenous animals playing cricket. The entries were put on display at the Royal Exhibition Building in Melbourne, and the judges took six days to deliberate before reaching their conclusion.

== Winning contestants ==
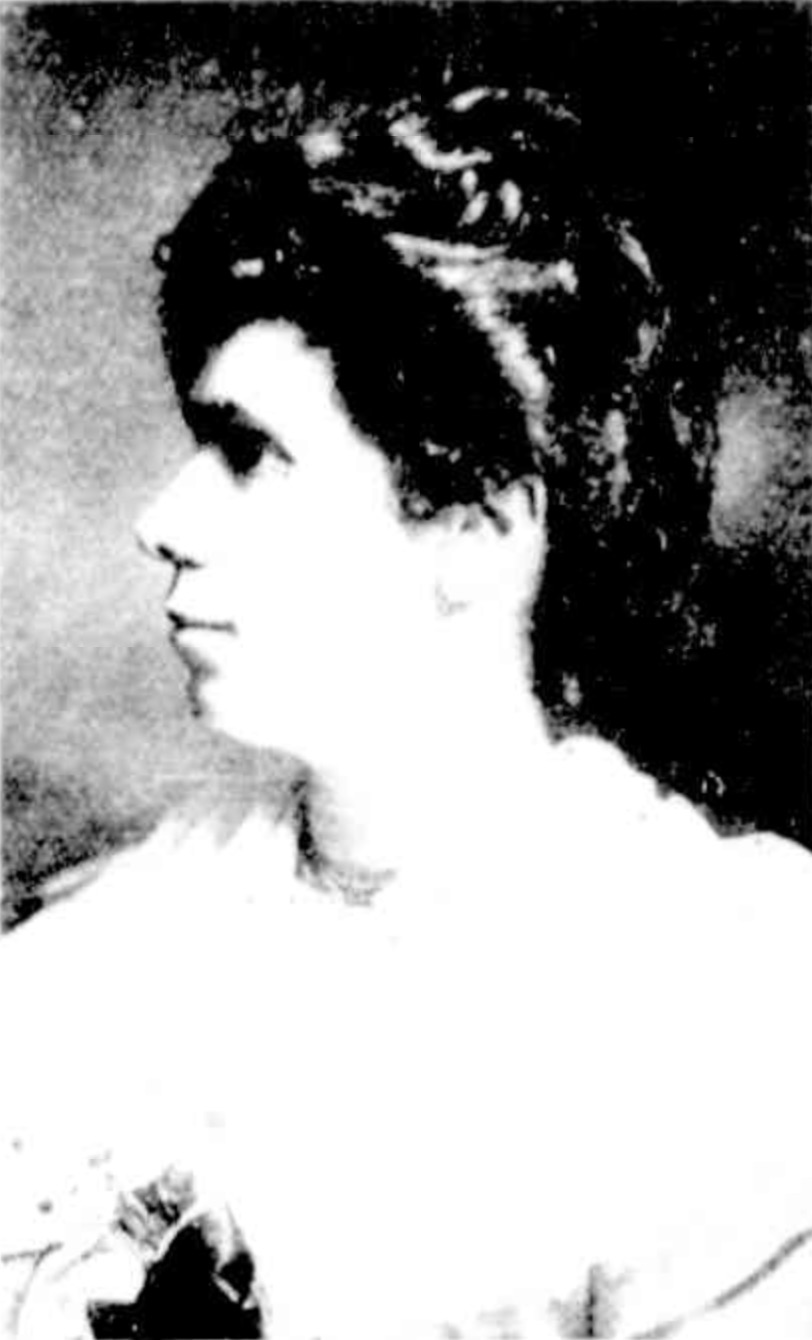
Annie Dorrington, one of the winning designers for the Australian flag

Five almost identical entries were chosen as the winning design, and their designers shared the £200 (equivalent to A$34,454 in 2022) prize money. They were:

- Ivor Evans, a fourteen-year-old schoolboy from Melbourne;
- Leslie John Hawkins, a teenager apprenticed to an optician from Sydney;
- Egbert John Nuttall, an architect from Melbourne;
- Annie Dorrington, an artist from Perth; and
- William Stevens, a ship's officer from Auckland, New Zealand.

The five winners received £40 (equivalent to A$6,891 in 2022) each. The differences from the present flag were the six-pointed Commonwealth Star, while the components stars in the Southern Cross had different numbers of points, with more if the real star was brighter. This led to five stars of nine, eight, seven, six and five points, respectively. The Inner Diameter of the six-pointed Federal Star in the lower Hoist was larger than that of the later seven-pointed version of the Federal Star in the lower Hoist. Alpha Crucis and Delta Crucis were of different sizes than they are today—with Alpha being larger than at present and Delta being smaller than at present.

== Flag of Australia ==
Commonwealth Blue Ensign (1903-1908)

The competition-winning design was submitted to the British admiralty for entry into their register of flags in December 1901. Prime Minister Edmund Barton announced in the Commonwealth Gazette on 11 February 1903 that Edward VII had approved it as the "Flag of Australia". The revised version made all the stars in the Southern Cross seven-pointed as well as of equal size, apart from the smallest, and is the same as the existing flag except for the six-pointed Commonwealth Star. A seventh point was added to the Commonwealth Star in 1909 to represent the territories.

== Judges ==
There were five judges for the competition and not seven. This misunderstanding seems to have arisen from the Review of Reviews listing the seven names of the competition's "judges and officials". The Review of Reviews gives the names of the five judges in the 20 August 1901 edition, and it subsequently confirms that number on 20 September 1901. The judges all had nautical links:

- Captain Chapman James Clare, Commonwealth Naval Forces (representing South Australia)
- Captain James Edie, Superintendent of Navigation, Government of New South Wales (representing New South Wales)
- John Evans, former ship's captain and member of the Tasmanian House of Assembly (representing Tasmania)
- Captain James Alexander Mitchell, Victorian Pilot Service (representing Victoria)
- Lieutenant Thompson, officer, HMS Katoomba (nominee of Rear Admiral Lewis Beaumont, Commander-in-Chief of the Australia Station)

Mr J. S. Blackham, chief of staff of the Melbourne Herald, was the competition official "who superintended the classification and arrangement of the flags" for "when they were shown in Melbourne's Exhibition Building"; Mr G. Stewart was another competition official described by Frank Cayley as "an expert in heraldry".

== Misconceptions ==
Several secondary sources have claimed the conditions stated the design should "be based on the British ensigns ... signalling to the beholder that it is an Imperial union ensign of the British Empire" and around the Southern Cross. In fact there was no such stipulation made either by the Reviews of Reviews, which had received the majority of the entries, or the federal government (although contestants in the Review of Reviews contest were advised that "A flag, perhaps, which omitted these symbols might have small chances of success; yet it seems unwise to fetter the competition with any such absolute limitations"). This error stems from Gwen Swinburne's 1969 book, Unfurled: Australia's Flag, in which she incorrectly attributes the above quote as a condition for the 1901 Federal Flag Competition. She had apparently used a passage from Barlow Cumberland's 1909 book, History of the Union Jack and the Flag of the Empire, as the basis of her quote.

== Gallery of Entries ==
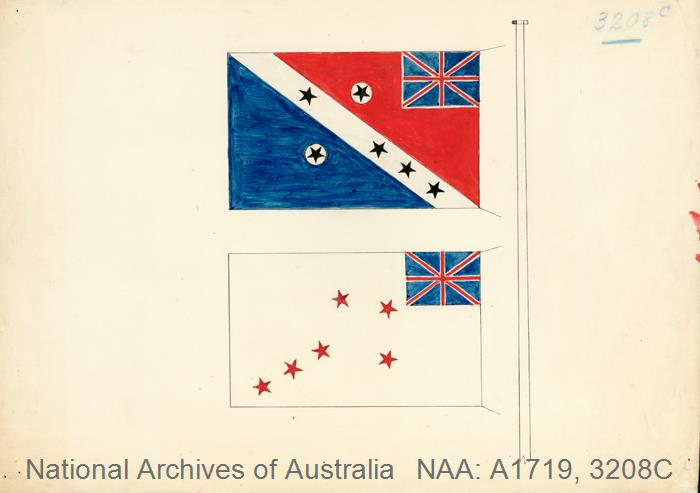
Entry for the 1901 Australian Flag Contest #3208

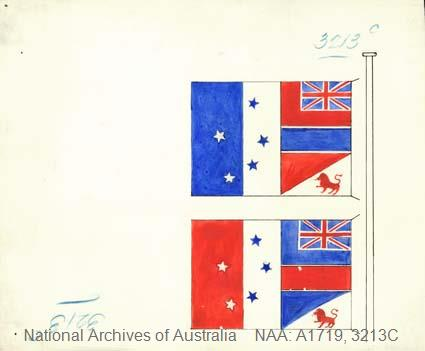
Entry for the 1901 Australian Flag Contest #2313

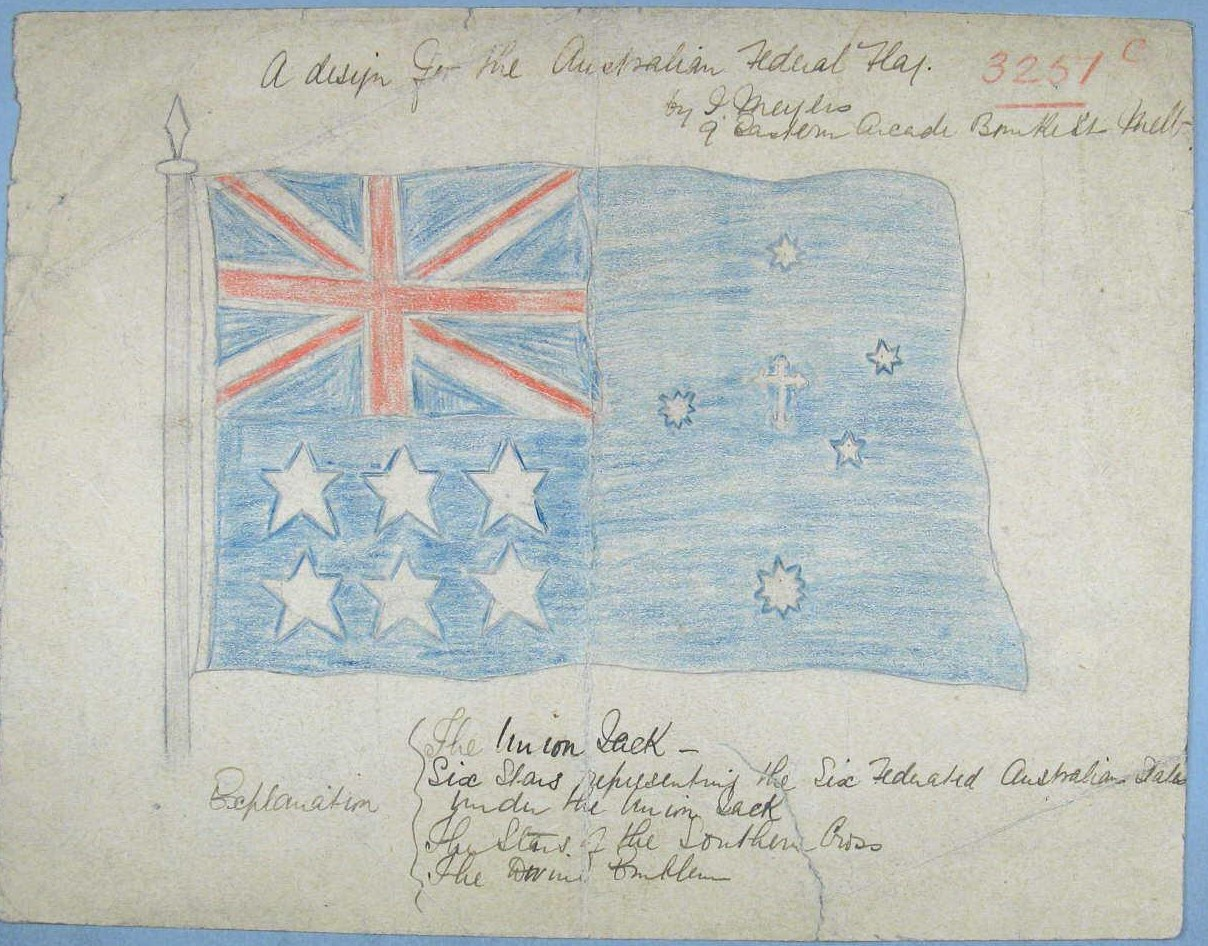
Entry for the 1901 Australian Flag Contest #5287

Digital recreation of entry for the 1901 Australian Flag Contest #3257

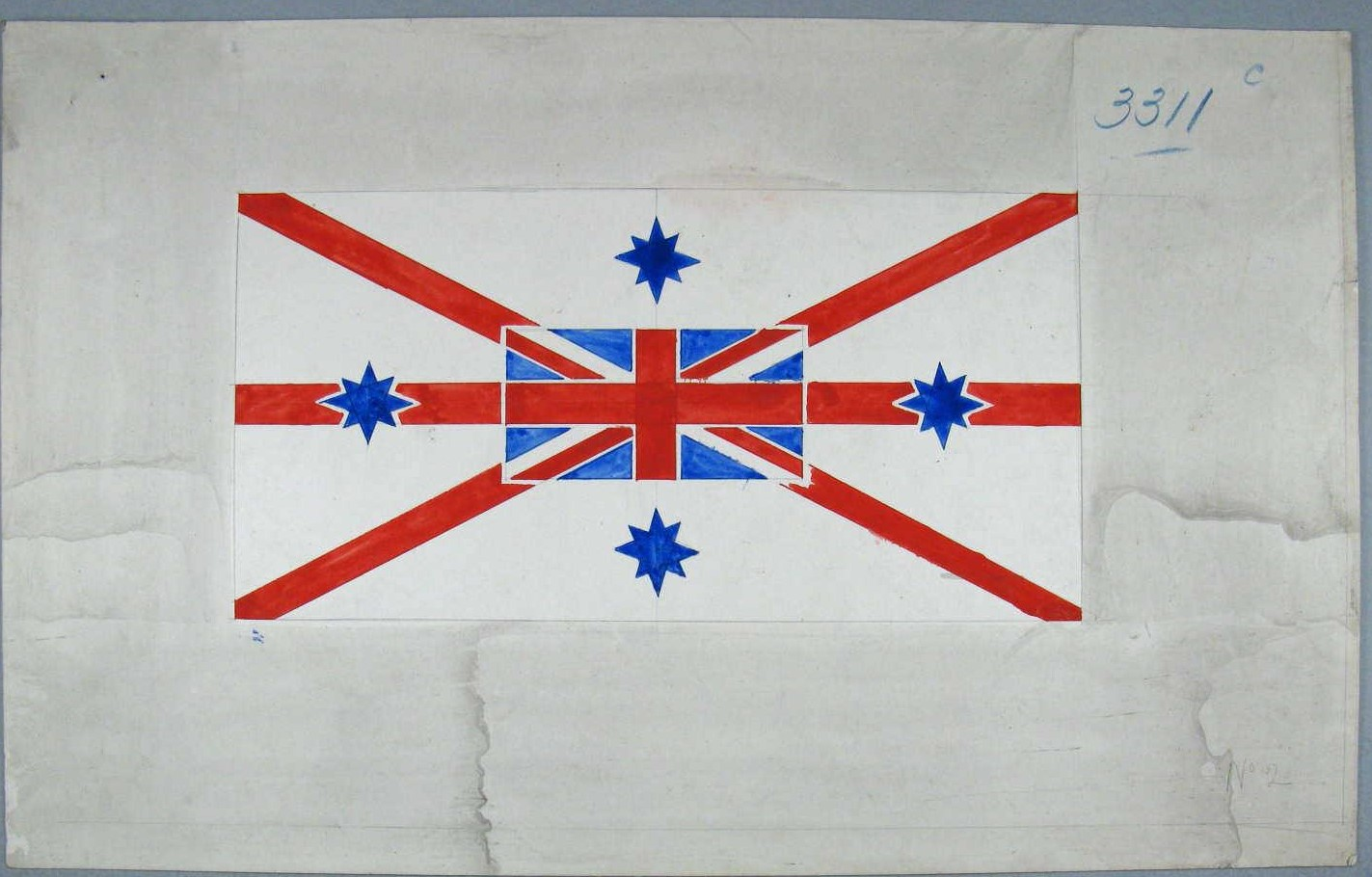
Entry for the 1901 Australian Flag Contest #3311

Digital recreation of entry for the 1901 Australian Flag Contest #3311

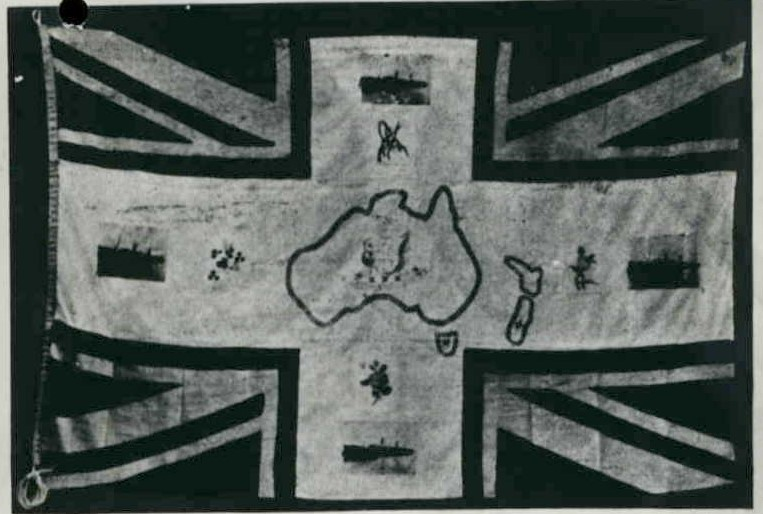

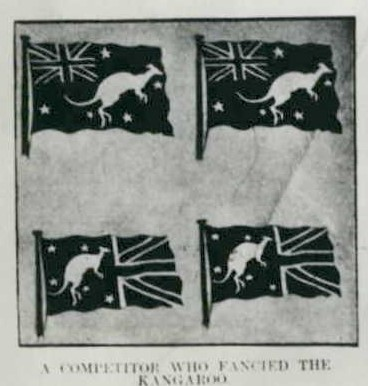

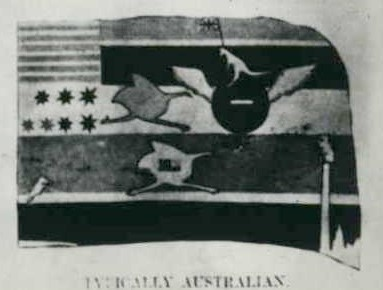

== See also ==
- Australian flag debate
- List of proposed Australian flags
- List of Australian flags
- List of proposed New Zealand flags
- List on commons
