= CERES Community Environment Park =

CERES Park
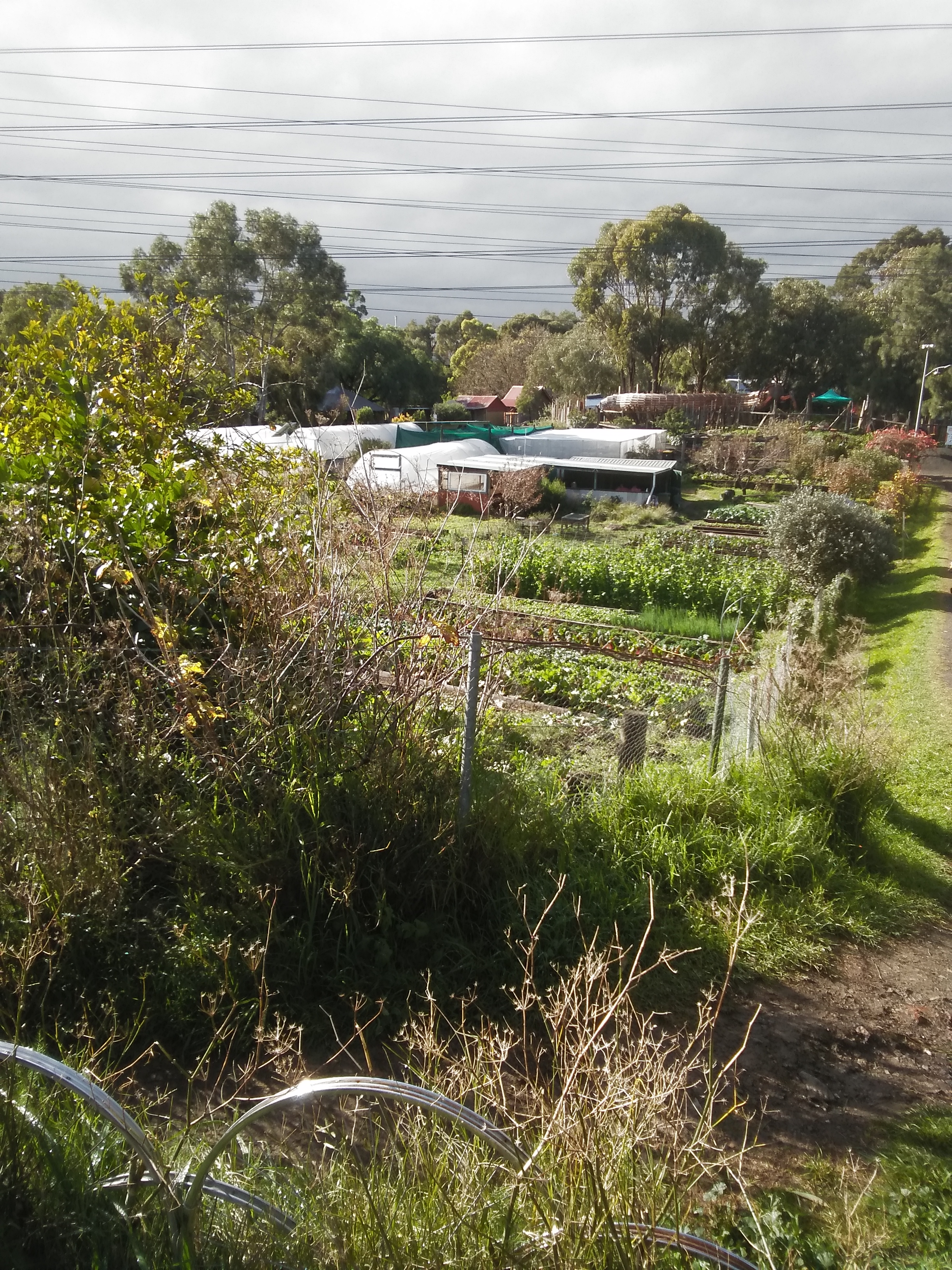
- Gardens at CERES

General information
- Type: 4.5-acre Green land
- Location: Brunswick East, Melbourne, Australia
- Coordinates: 37.766°S 144.984°E
- Opened: 1982

CERES Community Environment Park is a 4.5-hectare (11-acre) not-for-profit environmental education centre and social enterprise hub located in urban Brunswick East, Victoria, Australia.

Established in 1982 on a former rubbish dump, CERES Park operates on land owned by Merri-Bek City Council. The CERES Park is one of four locations run by the governing body of CERES EARTH Ltd, trading as CERES.

CERES is registered as a company limited by guarantee and is governed by a voluntary Board. It provides a range of programs and services including environmental education programs and workshops, an urban farm and community gardens, cafe, grocery, plant nursery and various other social enterprises. Its charitable purpose is "protecting and enhancing the natural environment, including by providing information and education to increase understanding of human impacts on the natural environment".

CERES is run by about 160 employees and many volunteers.

CERES stands for "Centre for Education and Research in Environmental Strategies", and is pronounced like the word "series." The name also connects with Ceres the goddess of agriculture in Roman mythology, as a large part of the Park is dedicated to urban farming.

== History ==
CERES Park is located on Wurundjeri Woi-wurrung land, along the banks of the Merri Creek.

The site was used as a Chinese garden during the first half of the 20th century and became a quarry for bluestone from 1945.

The first tree on the current incarnation of the site was officially planted by Dr Barbe Baker, founder of the Men of the Trees, on 16 September 1981. In 1982, local residents suggested making use of the land to grow vegetables and make compost as part of a "Work for the Dole" program. Various community initiatives and experiments with alternative technology soon followed, beginning the site. Along with Merri Creek Management Committee and Friends of Merri Creek, CERES and volunteers planted hundreds of trees and shrubs and lobbied governments to clean up the creek. A significant moment occurred when the Sacred Kingfisher, thought to have abandoned the area, returned in 1994.

Today, CERES is a popular place for education, farming and sustainability awareness, as well as a location for markets and social gatherings.

== Enterprises ==
Additionally to a large variety of workshops led at CERES about sustainability, gardening, cooking and sustainable practices, CERES provides different services:

- The Bakery & Grocery, selling a large range of local, organic and zero waste products and baked goods.
- The Merri Cafe, serving local, organic and ethical food and drinks.
- The Nursery & Bookstore, selling a variety of local bush food, edible plants, herbs and books.
- Joe's Market Garden, growing and selling fruit and veggies, situated in Coburg.
- Honey Lane, half an acre of land growing fruits and veggies sold at the Cafe and Grocery on site.
- The Bike shed, where volunteers repair donated bikes and sell them at a low price or donate them to those in need.
- The School of Nature and Climate, teaching children and the wider community about sustainability and climate change.
- CERES Fair Food delivering local and organic fruit, veggies and ethical groceries, included produce grown at CERES sites. Delivering from Preston.
- CERES Fair Wood providing sustainable timber and firewood from local and short supply chain, situated in Preston.

== Studies conducted at CERES ==
- Energy studies at CERES Community Environment Park, 1970.
- Organic (dis)organization and transformation: Stories of resistance and return at CERES Community Environment Park, 2021.

== Awards ==
- Victorian Premier's Sustainability Awards 2017 – Education: winner.
- Victorian Premier's Sustainability Awards 2016 – Education: finalist.

== Gallery ==
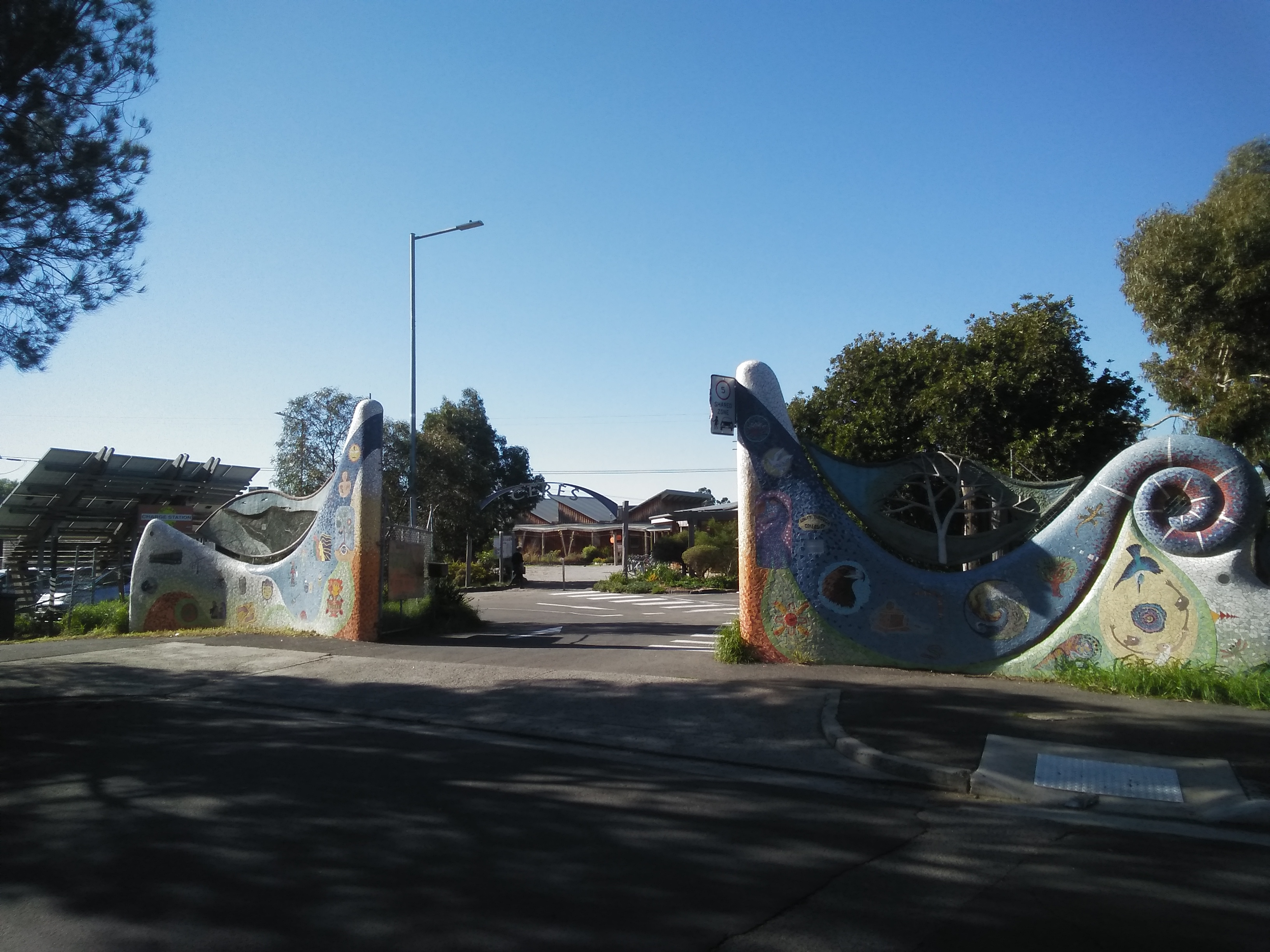
CERES Entrance

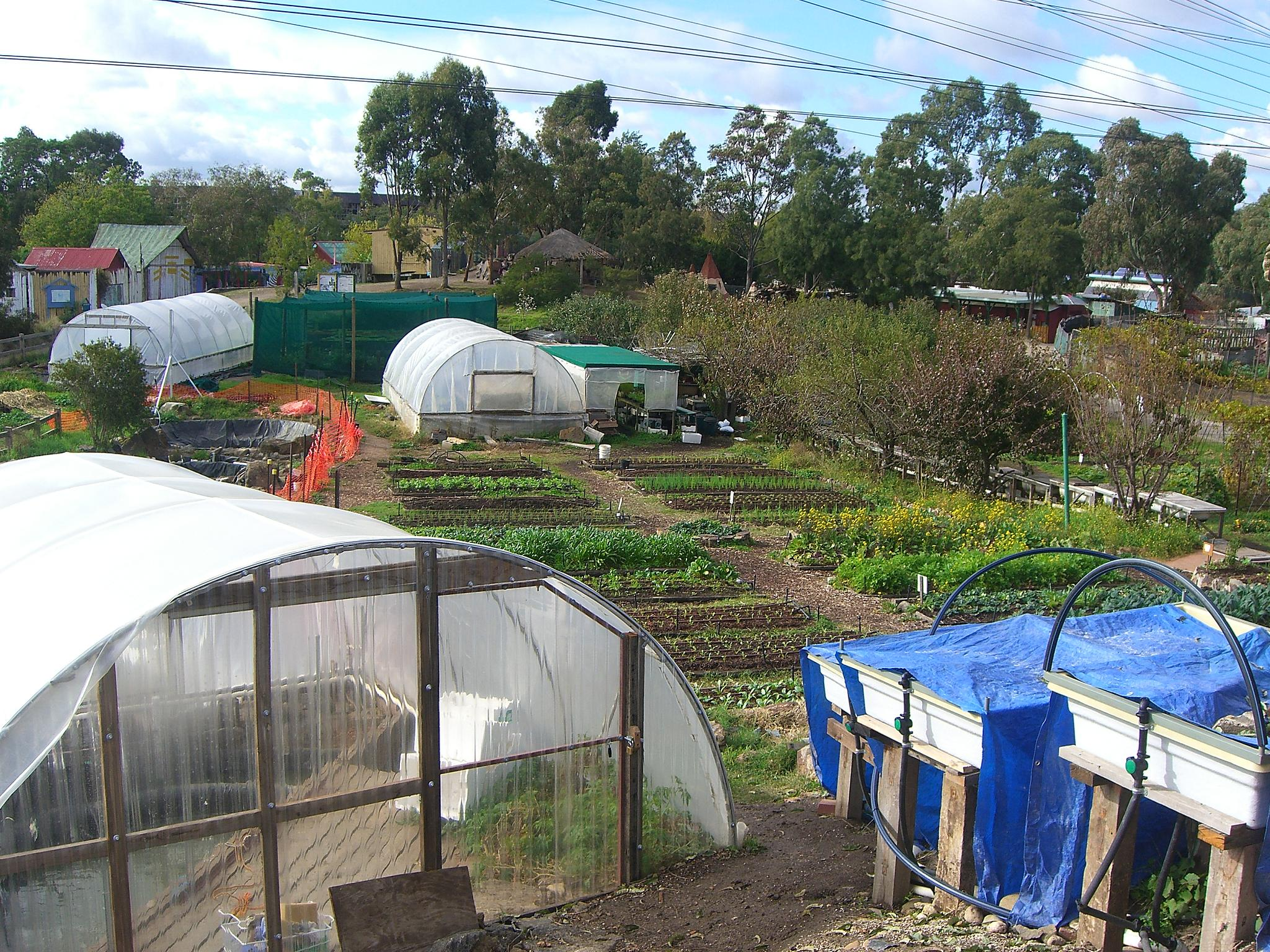
Green house and vegetable patches at CERES

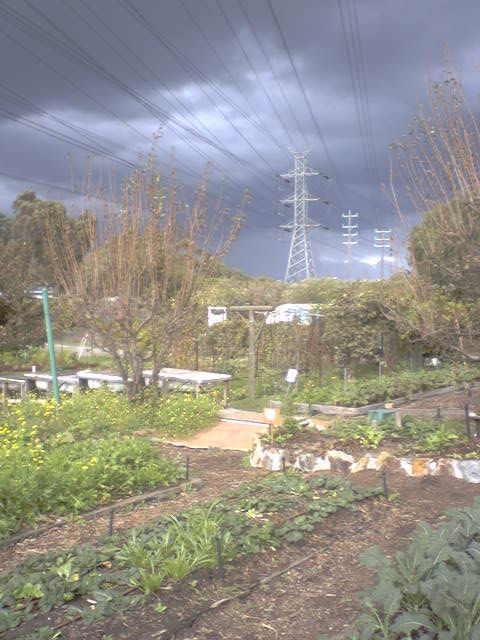
Gardens at CERES

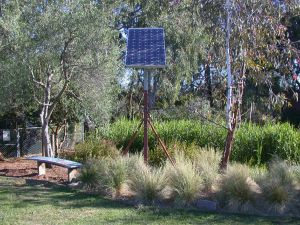
Solar panel at CERES

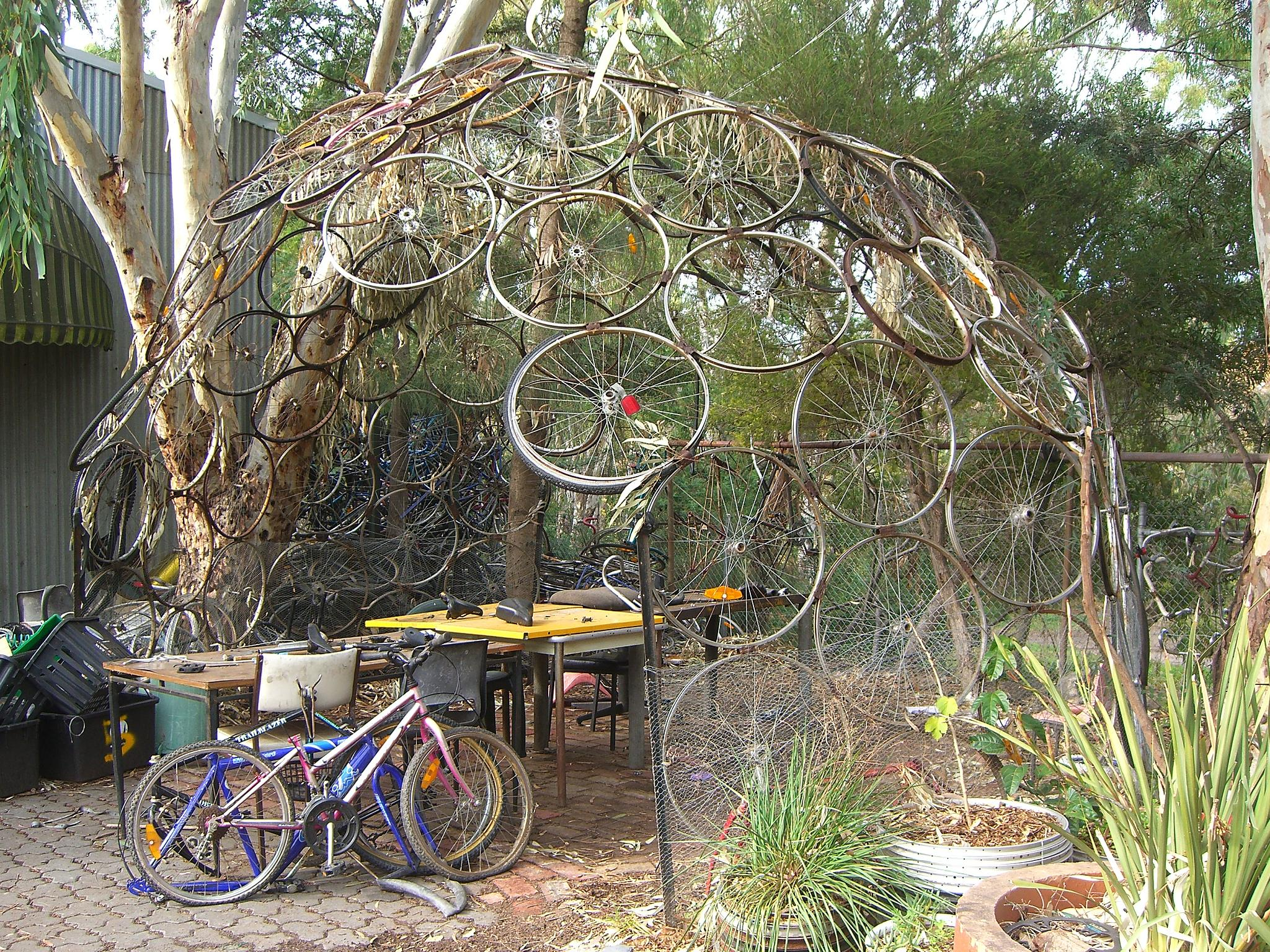
Bicycle wheel dome at CERES

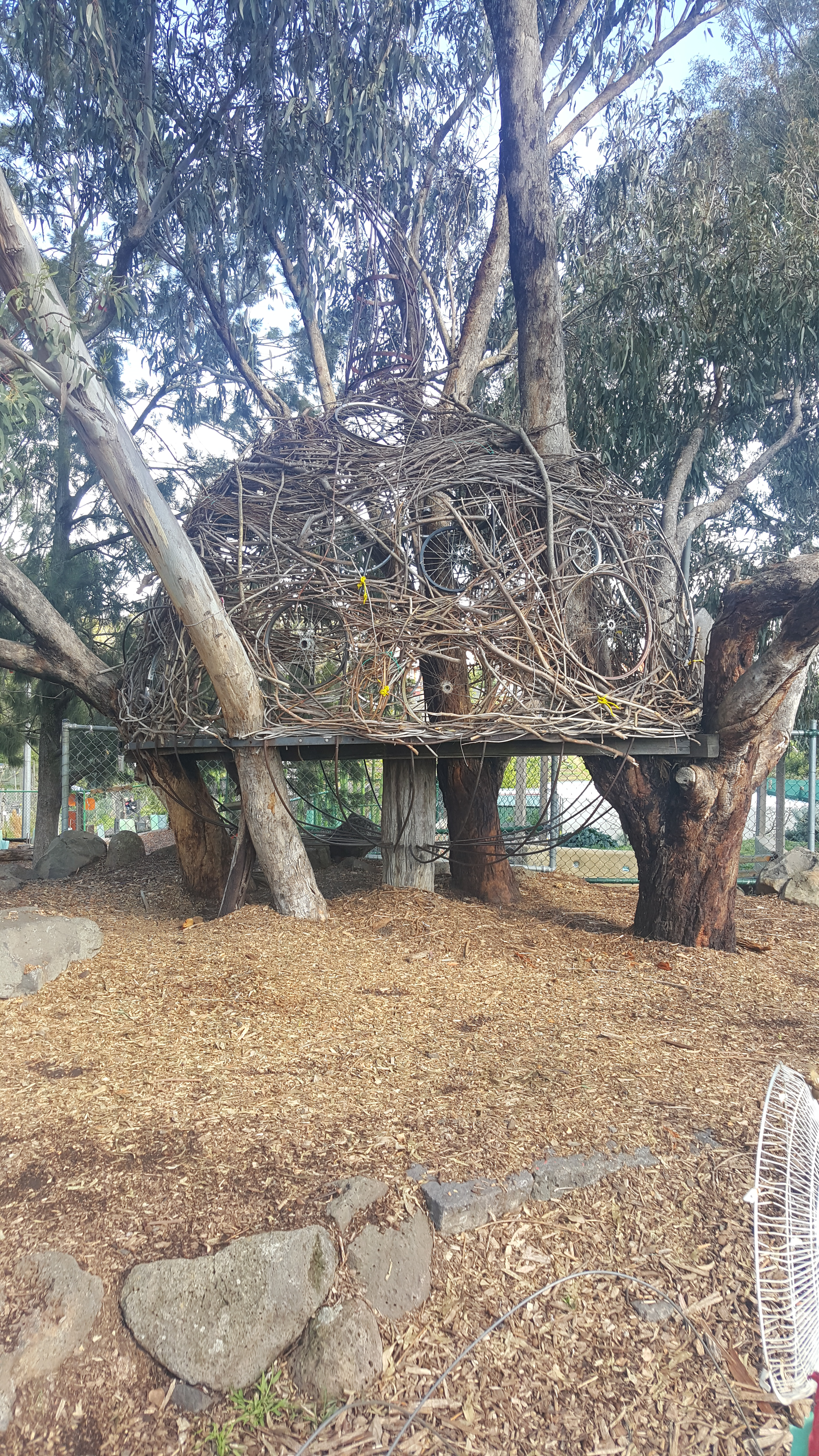
Cubby at CERES

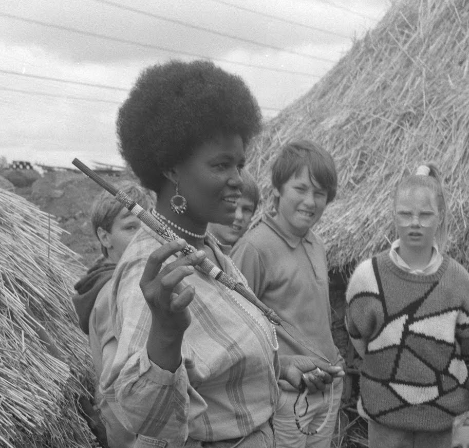
Ndeutala Hishongwa, a Namibian writer and activist, at CERES in 1988 in front of African huts.

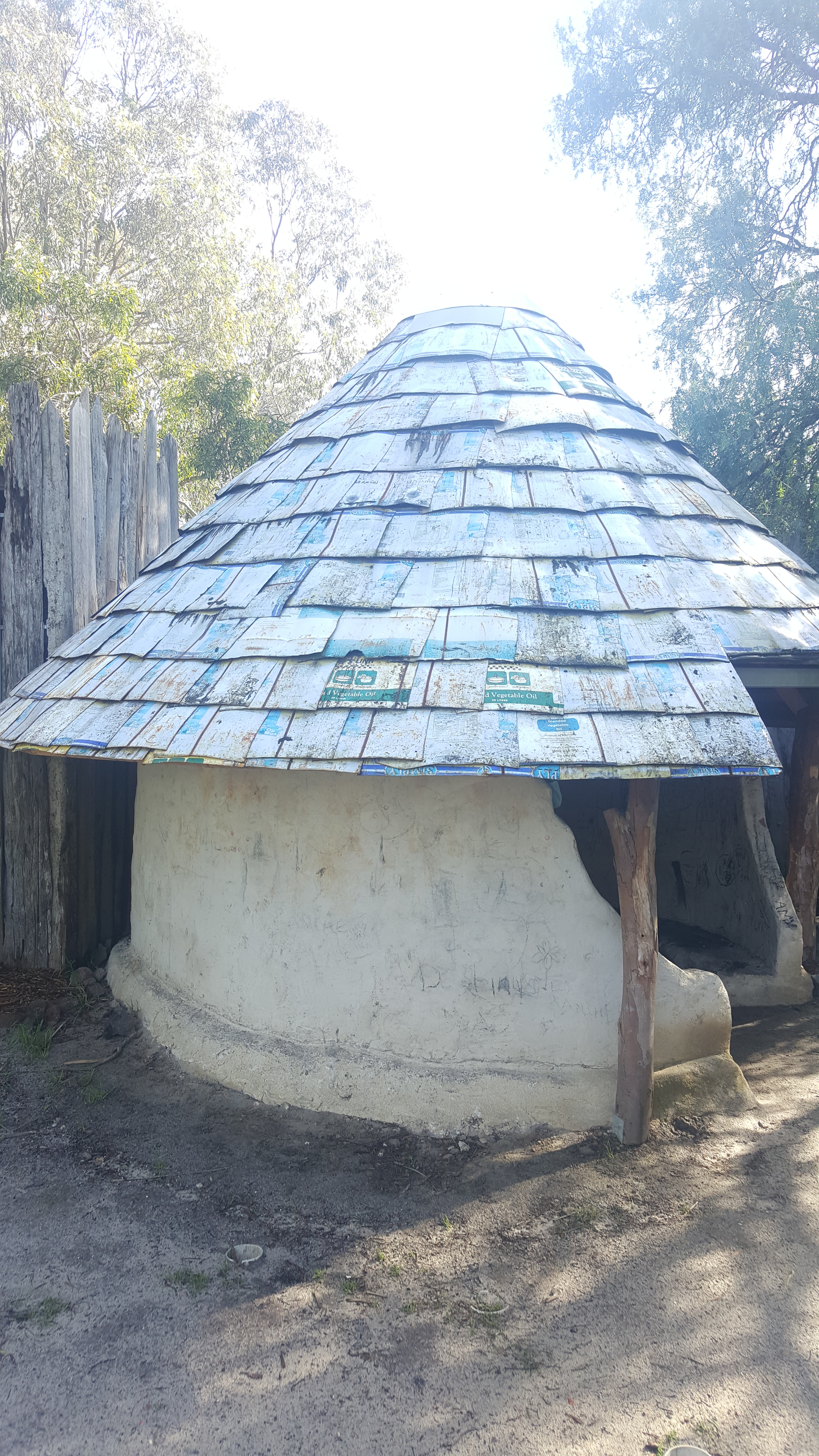
Hut at CERES

== See also ==
- Collingwood Children's Farm
- Permaculture
