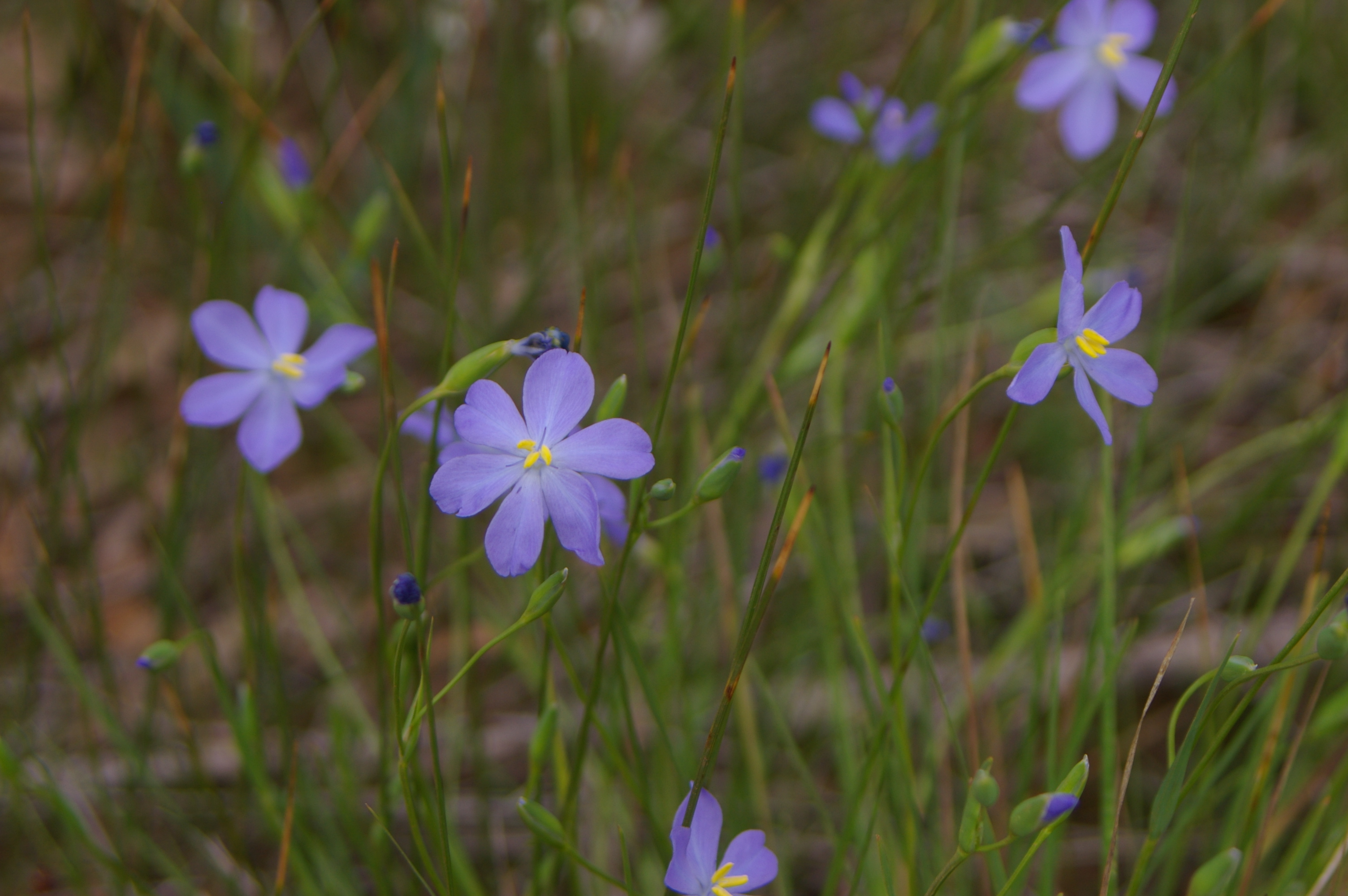
- Orthrosanthus laxus

Scientific classification
- Kingdom: Plantae
- Clade: Tracheophytes
- Clade: Angiosperms
- Clade: Monocots
- Order: Asparagales
- Family: Iridaceae
- Subfamily: Iridoideae
- Tribe: Sisyrinchieae
- Genus: Orthrosanthus; Sweet

Type species
- Orthrosanthus multiflorus Sweet

Synonyms
- Eveltria Raf.

= Orthrosanthus =

Genus of flowering plants

Orthrosanthus is a genus of flowering plants in the family Iridaceae first described as a genus in 1827. It is native to western and southern Australia and the Americas from Mexico to northwestern Argentina.

The genus name is derived from the Greek words orthros, meaning "morning", and anthos, meaning "flower". They are known commonly as morning irises.

== Description ==
These are rhizomatous perennial herbs. The linear to sword-shaped leaves are arranged in a layered fan. The flowers are usually blue, except in one white-flowered species. This genus is closely related to the genus Libertia. The flowers are very similar, but Libertia flowers are usually white.

Species

- Orthrosanthus acorifolius (Kunth) Ravenna - Colombia, Venezuela
- Orthrosanthus chimboracensis (Kunth) Baker - Chiapas, Costa Rica, Panama, Colombia, Venezuela, Ecuador, Peru, Bolivia, northwestern Brazil
- Orthrosanthus exsertus (R.C.Foster) Ravenna - Mexico, Honduras
- Orthrosanthus laxus (Endl.) Benth. - Western Australia
- Orthrosanthus monadelphusRavenna - southern Mexico, Central America
- Orthrosanthus muelleri Benth. Benth. - Western Australia
- Orthrosanthus multiflorus Sweet - Western Australia, South Australia, Victoria
- Orthrosanthus occissapungus (Ruiz ex Klatt) Diels - Peru, Bolivia, northwestern Argentina
- Orthrosanthus polystachyus Benth. - many-spike orthrosanthus - Western Australia
