= Ivor William Evans =

Australian businessman and national flag designer

Ivor Evans
- Born: 24 July 1887; Carlton, Colony of Victoria
- Died: 25 April 1960 (aged 72); Beaumaris, Victoria, Australia
- Education: Princes Hill State School; New College
- Occupation: Company executive
- Known for: Joint winner of the Federal Flag Design Competition
- Spouse: Stella Arthur (m. 1917)
Australian rules football career
Personal information
- Original team: Hawksburn
Playing career
Years	Club	Games (Goals)
1904	St Kilda	1 (0)

Ivor William Evans (24 July 1887 – 25 April 1960) was an Australian businessman. As a 14-year-old schoolboy, he was one of five winners of the 1901 Federal Flag Design Competition, held to design a national flag for Australia.

== Biography ==
Evans was born on 24 July 1887 in Carlton, Victoria, the third son of Sally Clara (née Russell) and Evan Evans. His father, an immigrant from Wales, was the founder of a firm that manufactured canvas goods. Evans attended Princes Hill State School before completing his education at the New College on a scholarship. He joined the Commercial Bank of Australia in 1904 and subsequently became manager of its Chillingollah branch.

At the age of 17, he played a single game of senior Australian rules football with the St Kilda Football Club during the 1904 VFL season.

=== Business career ===
In 1912, Evans left the Commercial Bank to join his father's company, becoming a partner in 1914. It was a significant supplier to the military during World War I, and in 1920 was incorporated as Evan Evans Pty Ltd. He became managing director in 1922 and oversaw further expansion, including the construction of a factory on Bourke Street, Melbourne, and the opening a retail store in Carlton. In 1944, Evans was appointed as an honorary controller of canvas goods within the Department of Supply. During World War II the company supplied "flags, tents, haversacks, waterbags, troughs, baths, aprons, chairs, beds, sleeping-bags, hammocks, tarpaulins and stretchers". It had outlets in four other states, and by 1952 had over 100 employees. He retired as managing director in 1956.

=== Personal life ===
Evans married Stella Arthur in 1917, with whom he had three children. His son Thomas was killed in action with the Royal Australian Air Force (RAAF) in 1945. He died at his home in Beaumaris on 25 April 1960, aged 72.

== Flag design ==
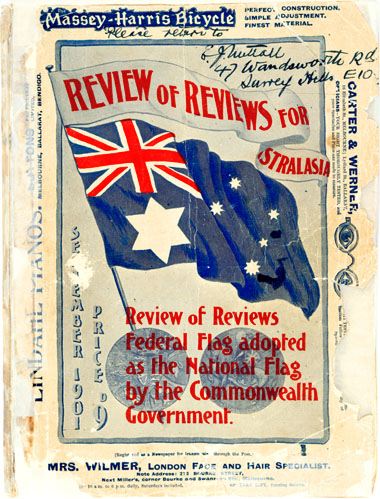
Edition of the Review of Reviews announcing the winning design

In 1901, aged 13, Evans submitted a design to the Federal Flag Design Competition held by the Barton government to choose a national flag for Australia. He shared the £200 prize with four others, including Annie Dorrington, as their designs were nearly identical. One of the five judges, John Evans, (Note: John Evans, a Tasmanian MP, was no relation to Ivor Evans, and the contestants' names were not known to the judges.) praised the technical accuracy of Evans' design in relation to his sizing of the stars of the Southern Cross based on their brightness. The winning entrants were invited to the Royal Exhibition Building to watch the first unveiling of the new flag.

In 1951, Evans wrote to Prime Minister Robert Menzies suggesting that each school should be presented with an Australian flag to mark the 50th anniversary of Federation, which resulted in over 10,000 flags being distributed. He continued to give interviews about the flag until a year prior to his death.
