= Princes Hill =

- Suburb
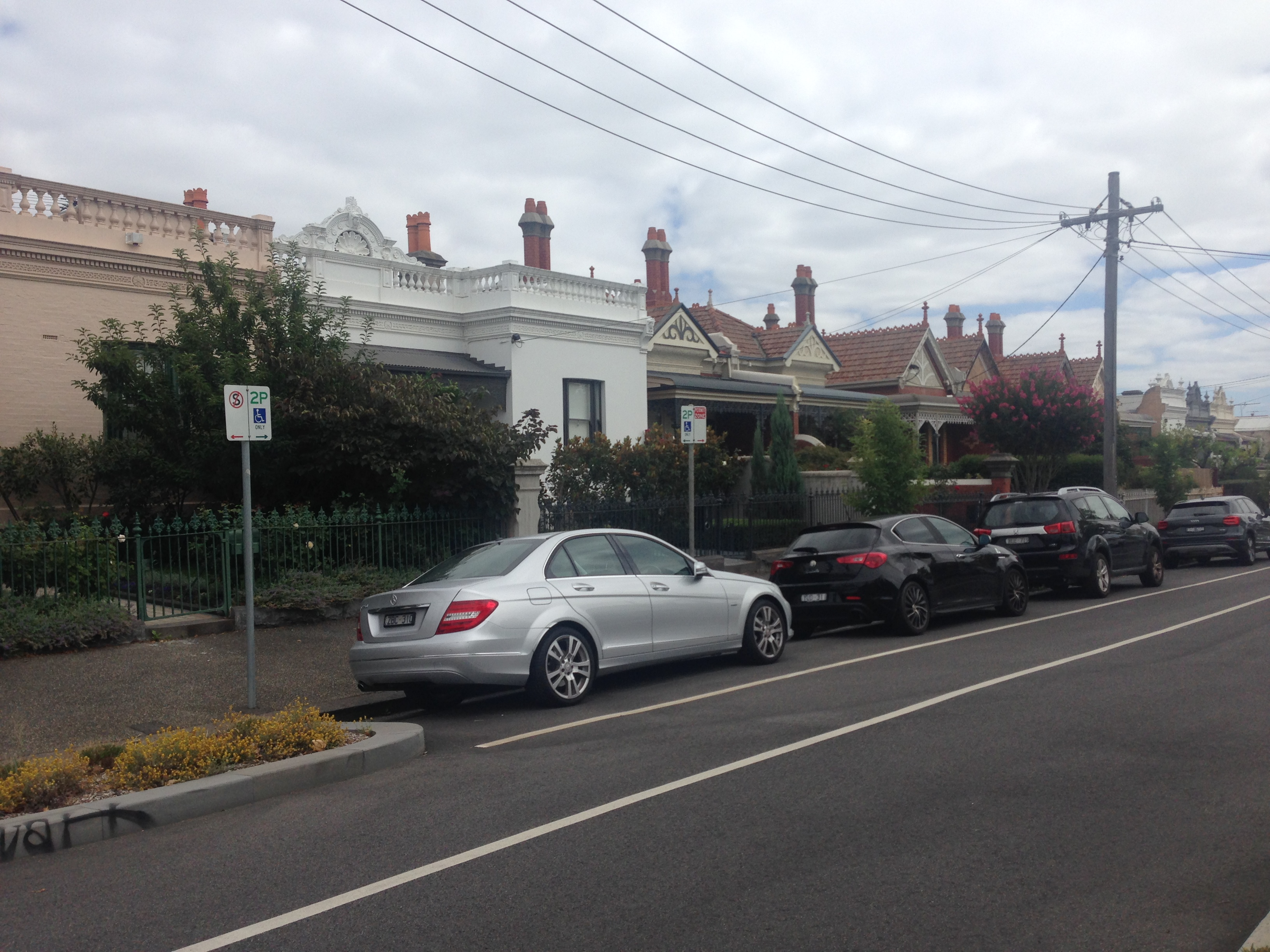
- McIlwraith Street, Princes Hill

- Interactive map of Princes Hill
- Coordinates: 37.784°S 144.966°E
- Country: Australia
- State: Victoria
- City: Melbourne
- LGA: City of Yarra
- Location: 3 km (1.9 mi) from Melbourne

Government
  - State electorate: Brunswick
  - Federal division: Wills

Area
  - Total: 0.4 km^{2} (0.15 sq mi)
- Elevation: 43 m (141 ft)

Population
  - Total: 2,005 (2021 census)
  - Density: 5,000/km^{2} (13,000/sq mi)
- Postcode: 3054
Suburbs around Princes Hill
Brunswick	Brunswick	Brunswick East
Parkville	Princes Hill	Carlton North
Parkville	Carlton North	Carlton North

Princes Hill is an inner-city suburb in Melbourne, Victoria, Australia, 3 km (1.9 mi) north of Melbourne's Central Business District, located within the City of Yarra local government area. Princes Hill recorded a population of 2,005 at the 2021 census.

The suburb is named for Queen Victoria's consort, Prince Albert.

Demographer Bernard Salt dubbed Princes Hill "Chick City" in 2003, after 2001 Census data revealed the suburb had the highest proportion of single women to men in Melbourne.

== St Michael's Princes Hill ==
The Argus, on Saturday 11 October 1884, reported that a meeting of members of the Church of England the night before at the Carlton Hall, in Prince's Street (now North Carlton), agreed that as "North Carlton was now thickly populated, while dwellings were being rapidly built on Prince's Hill", that it would "not be unreasonable to conclude that the time had arrived when the residents in the neighbourhood could support a church." The meeting agreed that it was "desirable that a church should be erected in the newly constituted parish of St Michael's, and that permission be obtained from the bishop in council to sell the original site on the west side of Canning Street, near Pigdon Street, for the purpose of purchasing another in a more favourable position at the intersection of Wilson and Paterson Streets, Prince's Hill." The church today is on the corner of Macpherson and McIlwraith Streets in Princes Hill.

By May 1885 "a temporary building on Princes Hill was nearing completion and was expected to be ready for opening, on Sunday the 17th inst."

== The school ==
On 2 November 1887 in the Legislative Assembly, it was moved by Mr Jones (for Colonel Smith) moved for a copy of all the papers relating to the purchase of land at Prince's Hill, Carlton, for a state school. The motion was agreed to.

In September 1889, it was announced "A commodious State school, which has recently been erected in Arnold Street, Princes Hill, North Carlton, to meet the requirements of that rapidly growing suburb was opened yesterday by the Minister of Public Instruction, in the presence of the intending pupils, who numbered about 250 and a large number of ladies and gentlemen.

James Robertson, the chairman of the Carlton School Board of Advice, presided at the gathering and stated that this was the sixth state school that had been opened in that suburb; there were in all about 5,000 children on the rolls of those schools of whom close on 4,000 attended regularly. Something was required, however on the part of the Education Department, the board of advice, or the truant officer to secure the regular attendance of the others so as to enable them to take full advantage of the benefits of the Education Act."

== Police ==
In May 1888 it was announced in The Argus that "A new police station is to be established at Princes Hill, North Carlton. A house has been rented from Mr Purvis near the corner of Lygon and Paterson Streets. It is intended to have one constable in charge, but the residents in the neighbourhood think that one representative of the law will be totally insufficient to protect them."

== Land ==
In 1884 The Argus reported on land sold in "Princes Hill, North Carlton, Wilson street, 66 x 165 to right of way £305 5s."
