= Carlton North =

- Suburb
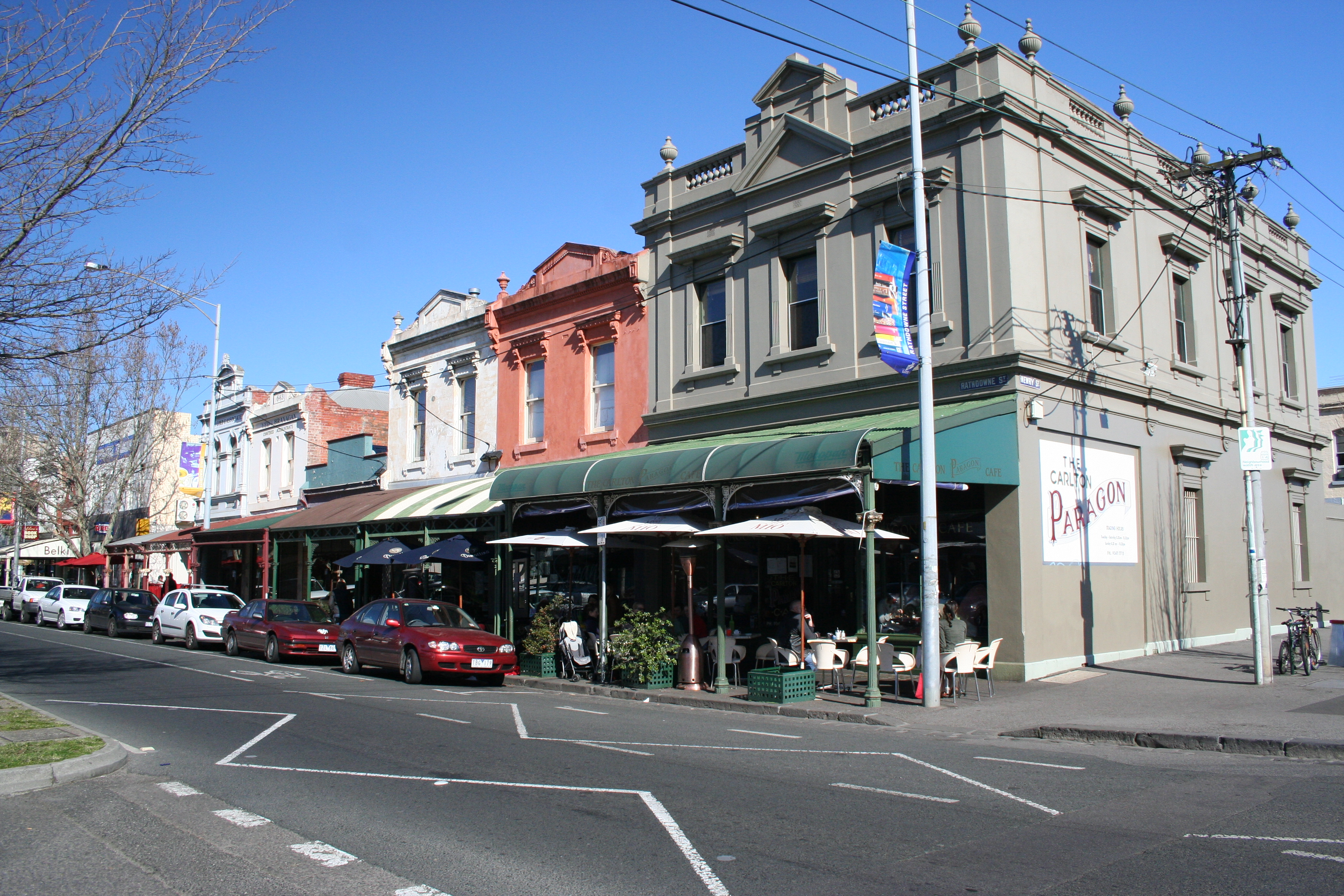
- Rathdowne St, Carlton North

- Interactive map of Carlton North
- Coordinates: 37.784°S 144.969°E
- Country: Australia
- State: Victoria
- City: Melbourne
- LGAs: City of Melbourne; City of Yarra
- Location: 4 km (2.5 mi) from Melbourne CBD
- Established: 1860s

Government
  - State electorate: Brunswick
  - Federal division: Wills

Area
  - Total: 1.9 km^{2} (0.73 sq mi)
- Elevation: 37 m (121 ft)

Population
  - Total: 6,177 (2021 census)
  - Density: 3,250/km^{2} (8,420/sq mi)
- Postcode: 3054
Suburbs around Carlton North
Brunswick	Brunswick East	Fitzroy North
Princes Hill	Carlton North	Fitzroy North
Parkville	Carlton	Fitzroy

Carlton North is an inner-city suburb in Melbourne, Victoria, Australia, 4 km (2.5 mi) north of Melbourne's Central Business District, located within the Cities of Melbourne and Yarra local government areas. Carlton North recorded a population of 6,177 at the 2021 census.

The suburb is bordered by Princes Street and Cemetery Road to the south, Royal Parade to the west, Nicholson Street to the east and Park Street to the north. Carlton North is home to the Melbourne General Cemetery and the Princes Park, which contains the Princes Park stadium.

Its main commercial area is along Rathdowne Street, which has numerous cafés, restaurants, small fashion boutiques, bookshops and other businesses.

Today, Carlton North, like other inner-northern suburbs of Melbourne, contains a mixture of white-collar professionals, bureaucrats and academics. The area has become more gentrified than Fitzroy North, Brunswick or Collingwood, resulting in significantly higher median property prices.

== History ==
Carlton North has its origins with the allotment of the Melbourne General Cemetery in 1853. Previous cemetery sites at Flagstaff Gardens and (what is now) Queen Victoria Market had become full, thus the new Carlton North site was established. In the same year a prison stockade, Collingwood Stockade, was built on Lee Street. This subsequently became an asylum until 1873 when it became the area's first primary school. A bluestone quarry was established at what is now Curtain Square. Subdivision into residential blocks began in 1869, with the emerging brick terrace houses standing in contrast to Carlton's timber cottages. Princes Park was established in 1844 and became home to the Carlton Football Club in 1864.

Cable tram lines were installed along Lygon Street, Rathdowne Street, and Nicholson Street in the 1880s. The Lygon and Nicholson street routes were subsequently converted to electric traction, but the Rathdowne Street route was closed in 1936 and replaced with buses. The area was also serviced by the Inner Circle railway line (passenger services were ceased in 1948 although it remained a goods line until 1980). However Carlton North station was located in Princes Hill and no railway station was ever built in Carlton North.

== Demographics ==
In the 2016 census, there were 6,300 people in Carlton North. The most common ancestries were English 24.6%, Australian 17.0%, Irish 12.4%, Scottish 9.2% and Italian 7.6%. 70.0% of people were born in Australia. The next most common countries of birth were England 3.7%, New Zealand 3.1% and Italy 2.4%. 77.1% of people spoke only English at home. Other languages spoken at home included Italian 4.5% and Greek 1.6%. The most common responses for religion were No Religion 54.3% and Catholic 18.9%.

== Commerce and culture ==
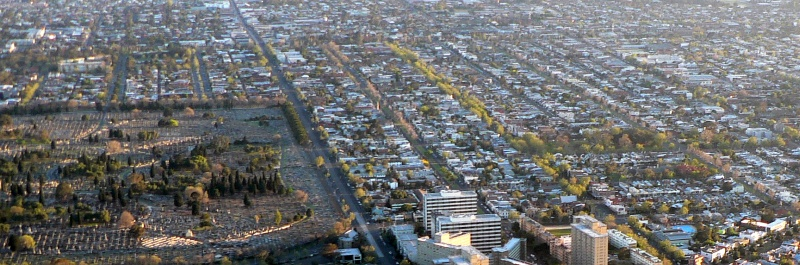
Aerial view of Carlton North looking north from Carlton. On the left is Melbourne General Cemetery

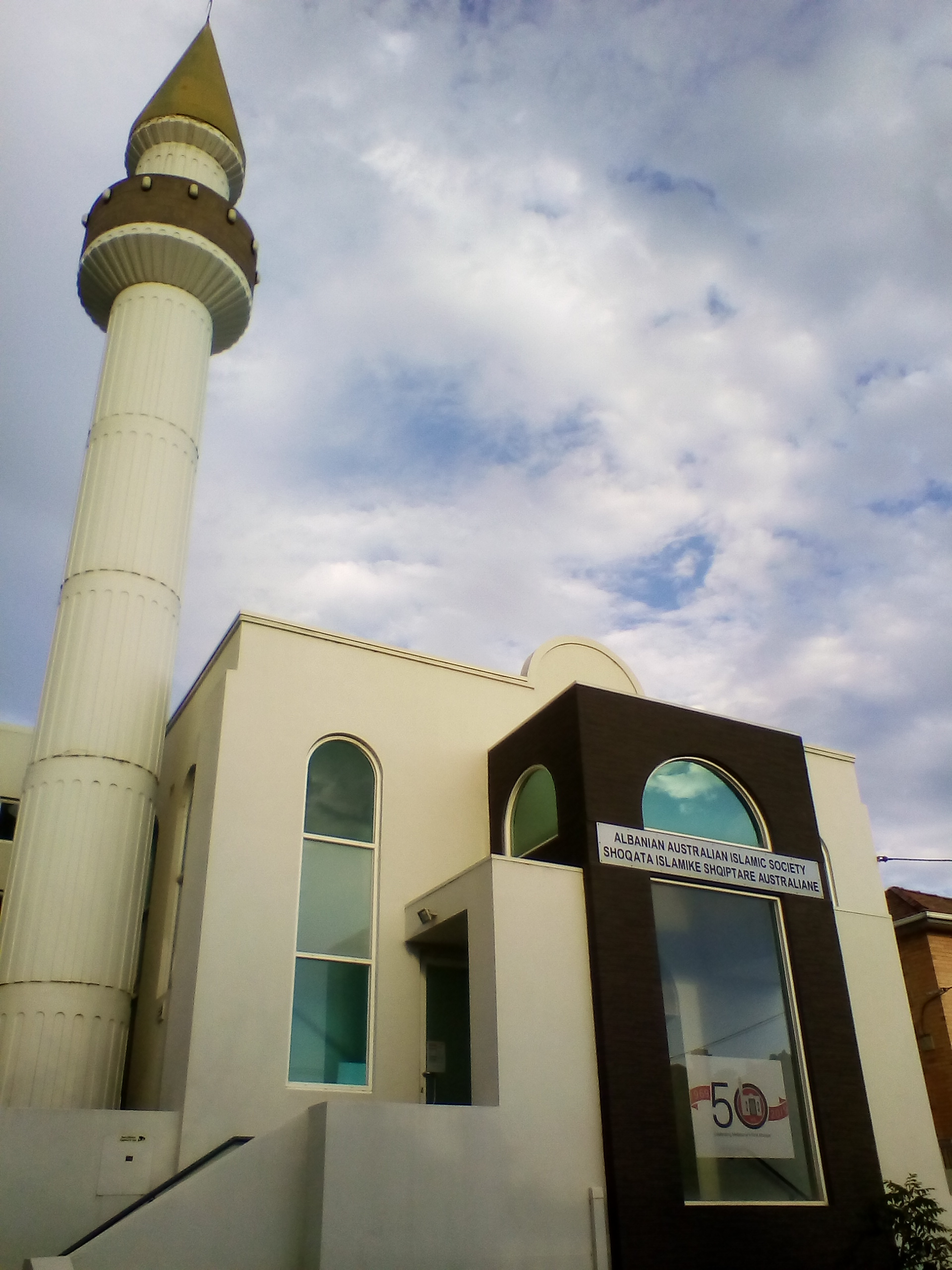
Melbourne's first mosque, built by the Albanian community

The main commercial precincts in Carlton North are the strip on Rathdowne Street (called 'Rathdowne Village') and the northern end of Nicholson Street. The most notable businesses in the area include the original La Porchetta pizza restaurant (which has since become an Australia and New Zealand-wide franchise) and the Natural Tucker Bakery.

In 2010 St Michael's Anglican Church celebrated its 125th anniversary.

The Albanian Mosque in Carlton North is the oldest mosque in Melbourne, built by Albanian Australians in the late 1960s.The Albanian Australian Islamic Society (AAIS) was founded in 1963. In addition to being a place of worship, the AAIS serves primarily as a cultural centre, offering religious education, youth programs (Youth Centre), and opportunities for the preservation of cultural heritage for the local Muslim community.

Dancehouse, a centre for independent contemporary dance, is located on Princes Street in the former Carlton Hall.

== Housing ==
Carlton North has a large amount of Victorian and Edwardian era attached and semi-detached terrace houses. Since the 1950s as a result of gentrification many of these properties have been renovated.

In 1968 the announced acquisition by the Housing Commission of Victoria of a block of houses on an area bounded by Lygon, Princes, Lee and Drummond Street (the "Lee Street block" became the trigger for the formation of the Carlton Association in March 1969). Following the placement of a Black Ban on the site by a number of trade unions (including the Builders Labourers Federation) and a strong public relations and lobbying campaign by the resident action group, the Carlton Association were successful in seeing the site saved by 1973, with a number of the properties heritage listed by the National Trust. Parts of Carlton North's housing also came under threat during the 1970s as a result of the Housing Commissions 'urban renewal' program as well as plans to construct the F19 Freeway through the suburb, however the activities of the Carlton Association, trade unions and other community activists prevented this from occurring and the suburb remains one of the very few in inner Melbourne without any Housing Commission flats. Today large parts of Carlton North are covered by various heritage overlays.

== Pubs ==
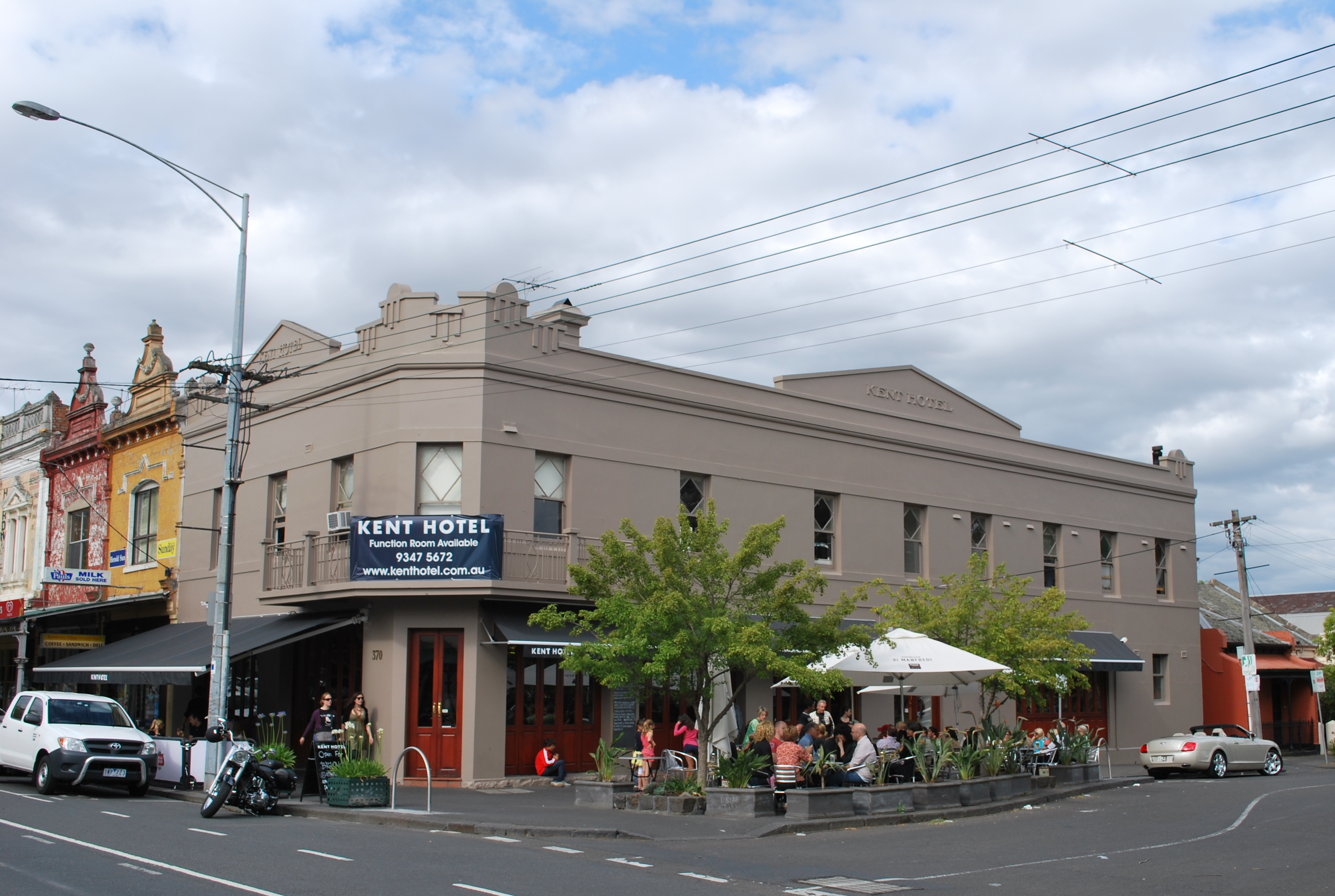
Kent Hotel in December 2009

- The Great Northern Hotel
- The Kent Hotel (Formerly the Duke of Kent) - Kent Hotel
- The Brandon Hotel

=== Former hotels ===
- The Fenwick Hotel. Converted into a large house
- Nicholson's Hotel (formerly Chestnut Tree Hotel, North Star Hotel and Polaris Inn Hotel). Extended and converted into flats.
- The Rising Sun Hotel. Now trading as Enoteca Sileno grocers

== Transport ==
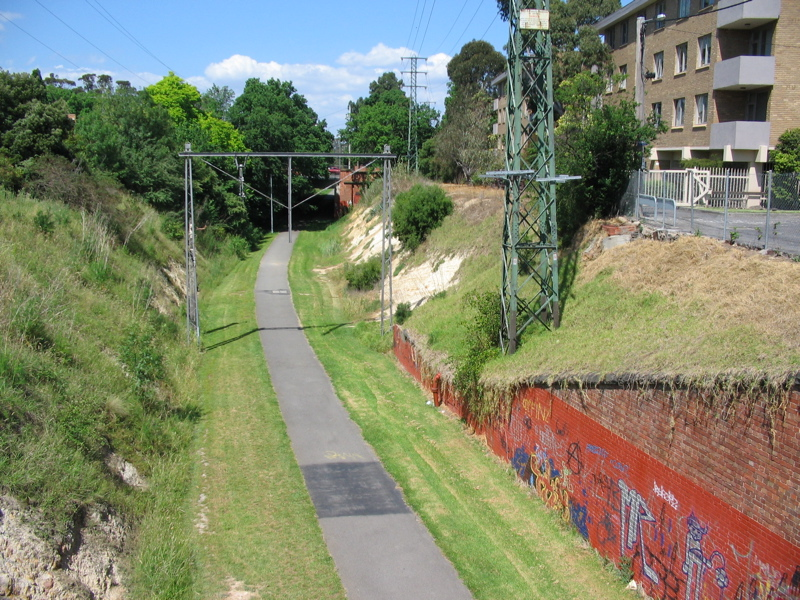
A section of the Inner Circle Line now an off-road bicycle trail between Royal Parade and The Avenue

The suburb is serviced by the main roads of Royal Parade, Lygon Street, Princes Street, Rathdowne Street and Nicholson Street.

Tram routes run north–south along Royal Parade (route 19), Lygon Street (routes 1 & 6) and Nicholson Street (route 96).

The railway station which was located in Princes Hill was closed to passengers in 1948 and freight in the early 1980s. Part of the former line was utilised for Housing Commission units for the elderly and part was turned into a rather long and narrow park. Carlton North also has significant segregated bicycle facilities, including the Capital City Trail. The Carlton North section is a converted rail trail.

== Parks and open space ==
=== Melbourne General Cemetery ===
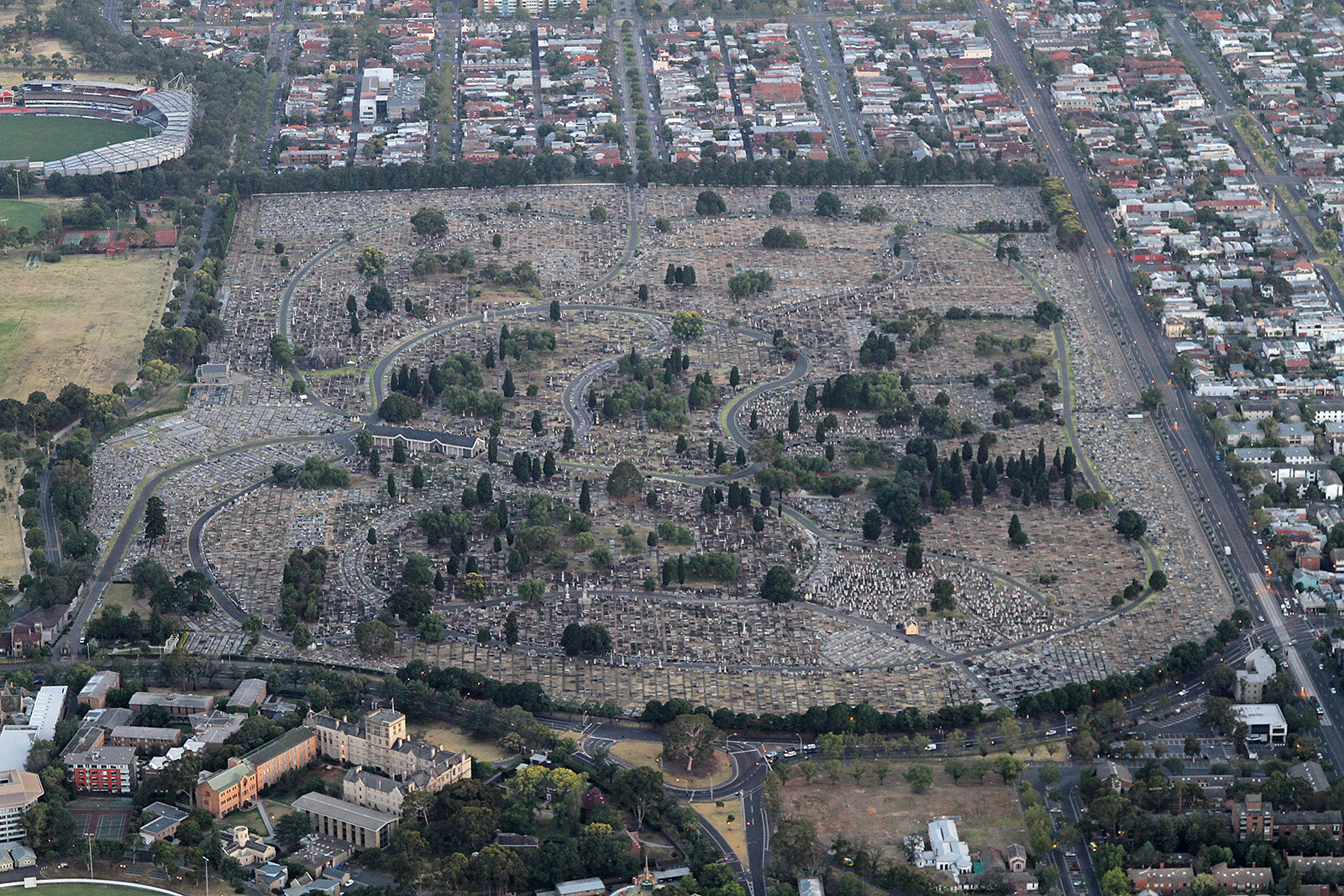
Aerial view of the Melbourne General Cemetery and parts of Carlton North

Melbourne General Cemetery is a large (43 hectare) necropolis which is notable for containing the graves of four Prime Ministers of Australia: James Scullin, Sir Robert Menzies, Harold Holt, and Sir John Gorton. Holt's stone is a memorial as his body was never recovered after he disappeared at sea. The tomb of famous Australian explorers Robert O'Hara Burke and William John Wills (see Burke and Wills expedition) is also located in the cemetery, with an inscription reading "Comrades in a great achievement and companions in death."

=== Princes Park ===
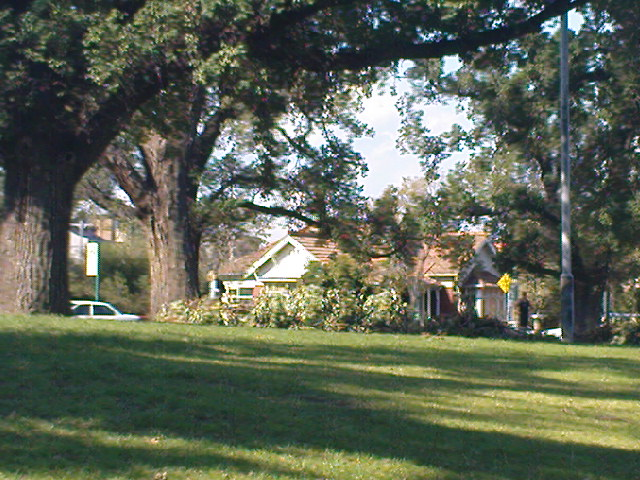
Princes Park

== Educational facilities ==
- Princes Hill Secondary College
- Carlton North Primary School (a.k.a. Lee Street)
