= Australian Aboriginal flag =

Official flag representing Aboriginal Australians

- Aboriginal Flag
- Use: Flag of Aboriginal Australians
- Proportion: 2:3 (originally), 1:2 (also commonly used)
- Adopted: 14 July 1995
- Design: A horizontal bicolour of black and red with a yellow disc in the centre
- Designed by: Harold Thomas

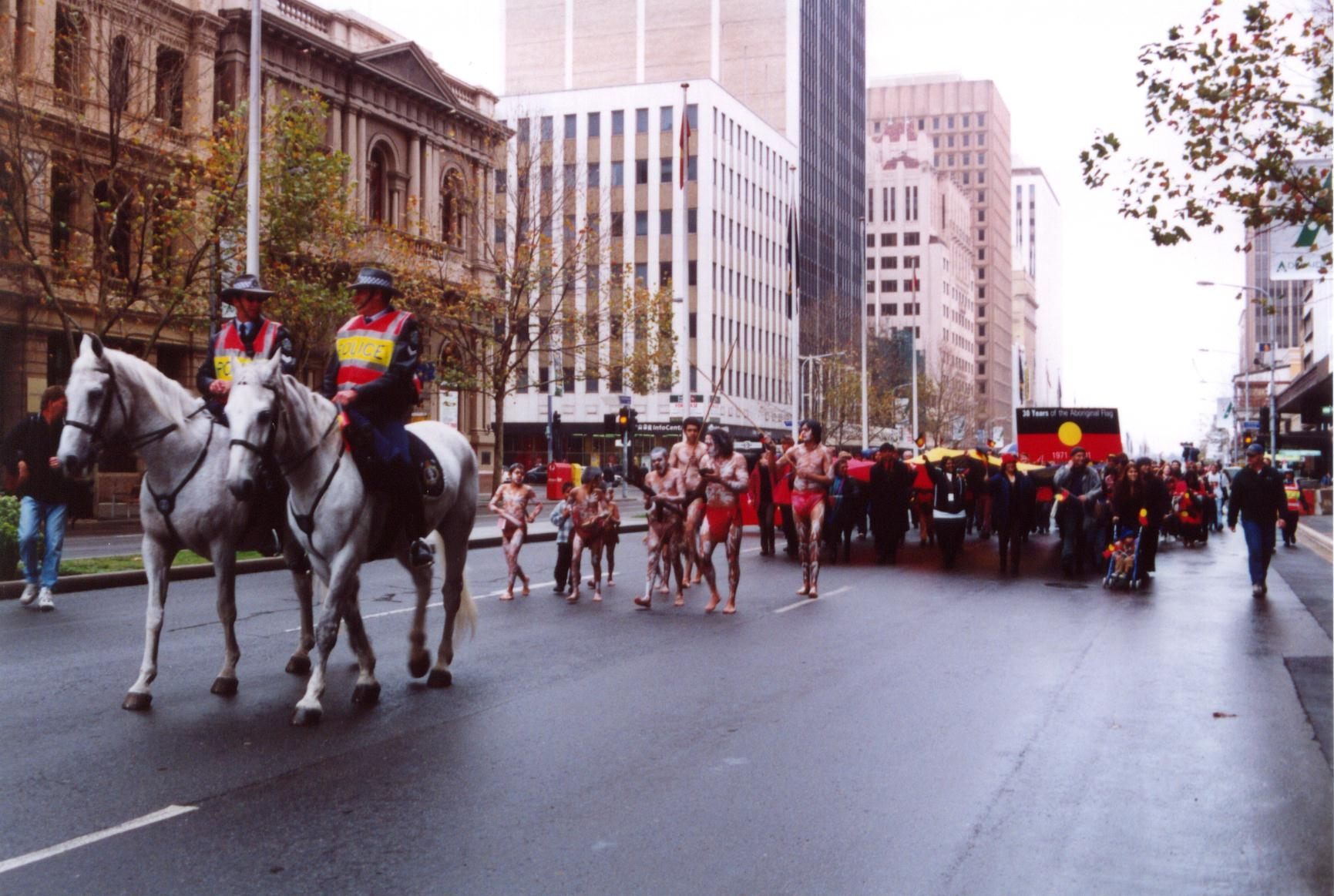
Marching from Parliament House down King William Street to Victoria Square/Tarntanyangga, Adelaide, to celebrate the 30th anniversary of the Aboriginal flag, 8 July 2001

The Australian Aboriginal flag is an official flag of Australia that represents Aboriginal Australians. It was granted official status in 1995 under the Flags Act 1953, together with the Torres Strait Islander flag, in order to advance reconciliation and in recognition of the importance and acceptance of the flag by the Australian community. The two flags are often flown together with the Australian national flag.

The Australian Aboriginal flag was designed by Aboriginal artist Harold Thomas in 1971, and it was first flown in Adelaide in July of that year. Thomas held the intellectual property rights to the flag's design until January 2022, when he transferred the copyright to the Commonwealth government. The flag was designed for the land rights movement and became a symbol of Aboriginal people of Australia.

The flag is horizontally and equally divided into a black region (above) and a red region (below); a yellow disc is superimposed over the centre of the flag. The overall proportions of the flag, as proclaimed and in its original design, are 2:3; however, the flag is often reproduced in the proportions 1:2 as with the Australian national flag.

== Status ==
On 14 July 1995, the Keating government advised the proclamation of the Aboriginal flag as "the flag of the Aboriginal peoples of Australia and to be known as the Australian Aboriginal flag", under section five of the Flags Act 1953. The proclamation noted that the flag was "recognised as the flag of the Aboriginal peoples of Australia and a flag of significance to the Australian nation generally". Due to an administrative oversight, the 1995 proclamation was not lodged so that it would continue in force indefinitely; hence it automatically expired on 1 January 2008. It was therefore almost identically replaced, on 25 January 2008, with effect as from 1 January.

== Design ==
A version of the flag in 1:2 proportions

=== Symbolic meaning ===
The symbolic meaning of the flag colours (as stated by Harold Thomas) are:

- Black – "represents the Aboriginal people of Australia"
- Yellow circle – "represents the Sun, the giver of life and protector"
- Red – "represents the red earth, the red ochre used in ceremonies and Aboriginal peoples' spiritual relation to the land"

Discussing the process of designing the flag in a copyright trial, Thomas also elaborated that the black represented "black consciousness, black awareness, black power [and] be[ing] proud of your blackness". The other colours of yellow and red were sourced from the predominant colours used to decorate pukamani poles. Thomas also explained why the black was placed above the red stripe:

I wanted to make it unsettling. In normal circumstances you'd have the darker colour at the bottom and the lighter colour on top and that would be visibly appropriate for anybody looking at it. It wouldn't unsettle you. To give a shock to the viewer to have it on top had a dual purpose, was to unsettle ... The other factor why I had it on top was the Aboriginal people walk on top of the land.

Others, including Nova Perris and social worker Tileah Drahm-Butler, have also interpreted the red as representing the blood shed by Aboriginal people.

=== Colours ===
A 2:3 version of the flag using RGB approximations of the official Pantone colours

The official colour specifications of the Australian Aboriginal flag are:

Scheme	Red	Yellow	Black
Pantone	1795 C (or 179 C)	123 C	Black C
RGB (Hex)	204–0–0 (#CC0000)	255–255–0 (#FFFF00)	0–0–0 (#000000)
CMYK	0%–100%–100%–30%	0%–0%–100%–0%	0%–0%–0%–100%

In most cases, on-screen or digital reproductions of the flag should use the RGB colours as in the table above. When displaying in physical fabric formats, it is much preferred to use the Pantone specifications. When printing on paper, the CMYK colours are superior.

=== Shape ===
The original design was in the proportion 2:3, rather than 1:2, to make the flag more "squared up", as Thomas felt that the Australian Flag, at 1:2, was too long.

== History ==
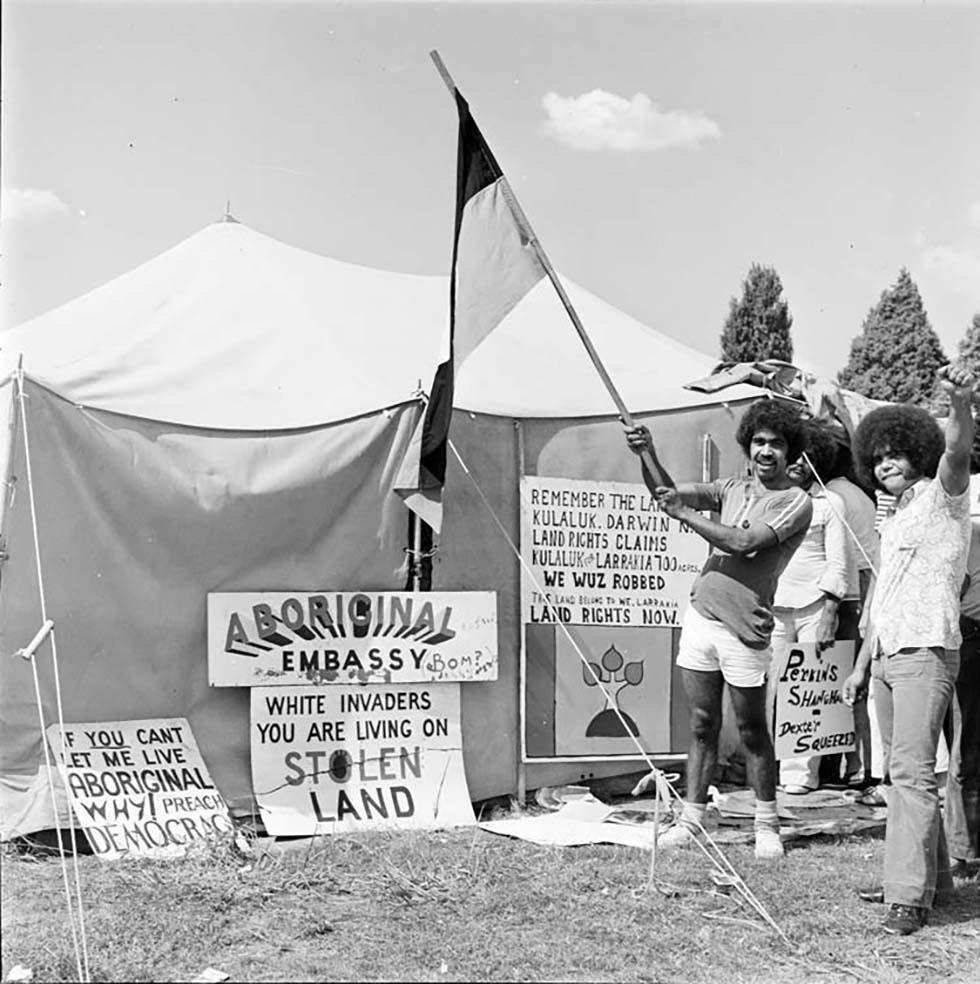
The Aboriginal flag at the Aboriginal Tent Embassy in 1974

Harold Thomas first discussed the need to create an Aboriginal flag with Gary Foley, several days or months before National Aborigines Day Observance Committee (NADOC) day in 1971. He first thought about the need for an Aboriginal symbol after attending a protest in 1970 when Aboriginal people were unrecognisable in a crowd of mostly white supporters. Thomas recalls that the Aboriginal flag came to him fully formed in a moment of inspiration, independently or in conversation with Foley.

Once he had come up with the design, Thomas selected cloth at the Harris Scarfe store in Rundle Mall, Adelaide. The first flag was sewn together by Sandra Lee Hanson, a colleague of Thomas working at the South Australian Museum. While the original flag is lost, offcuts from the flag were found in the museum in 2014.

The flag was first flown on NADOC day in Victoria Square in Adelaide on 9 July 1971 during a land rights rally. The flag was later adopted by the Redfern Black Caucus, with members of the group going on to found the Aboriginal Tent Embassy in Canberra, where the flag was used from late 1972. The original flag possibly flew here or remained in South Australia. In the early months of the embassy—which was established in February that year—other designs were used, including flags with the black, red and green colours of the Pan-African flag as a symbol of black consciousness, and a flag with a red-black field containing a spear and four crescents in yellow.

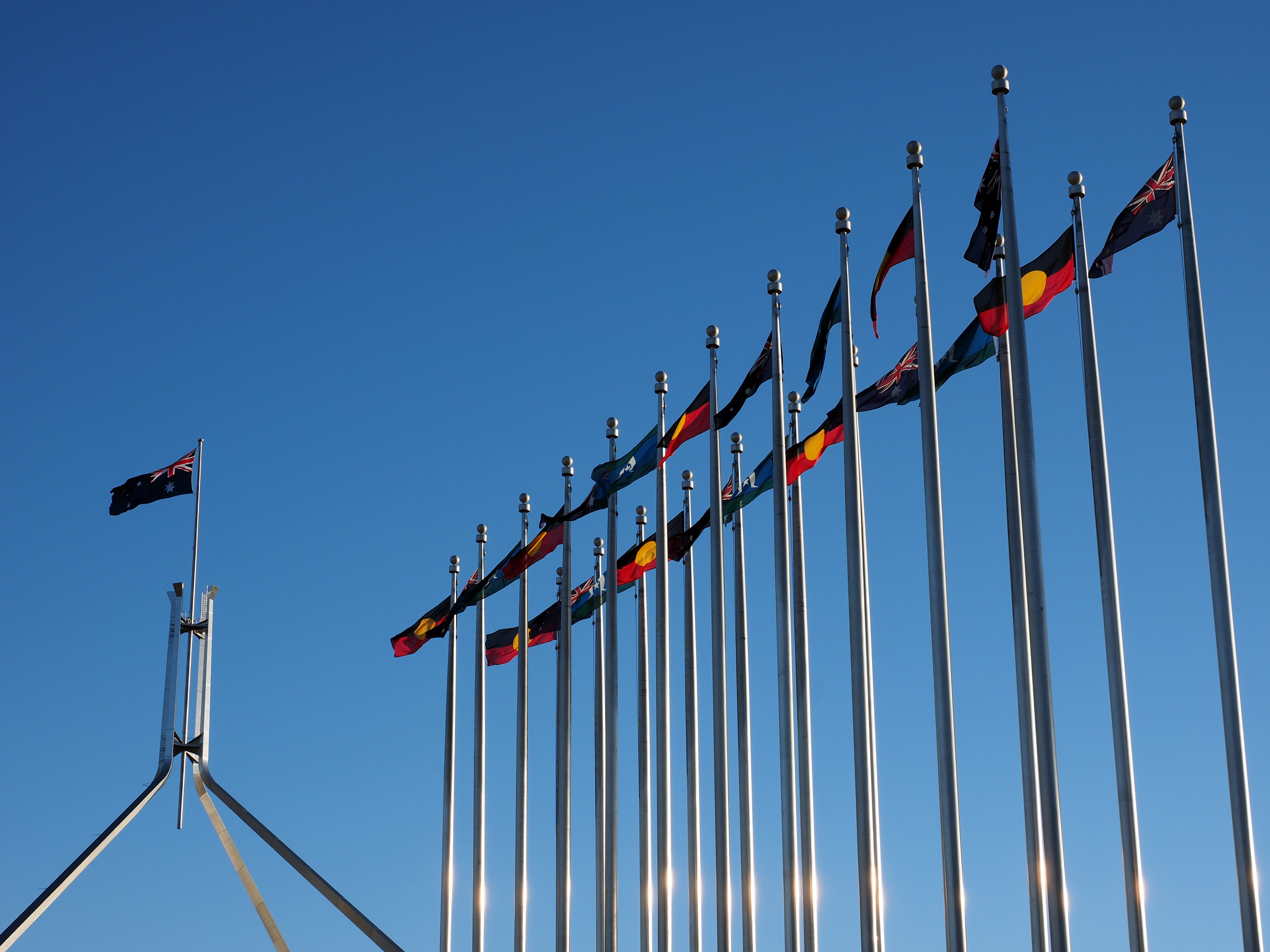
The Australian Aboriginal, Torres Strait Islander and Australian flags being flown outside Parliament House to mark NAIDOC Week

Cathy Freeman caused controversy at the 1994 Commonwealth Games by carrying the Aboriginal flag as well as the Australian national flag during her victory lap of the arena, after winning the 200 metres sprint; only the national flag is meant to be displayed. Despite strong criticism from both Games officials and Australian team president Arthur Tunstall, Freeman carried both flags again after winning the 400 metres.

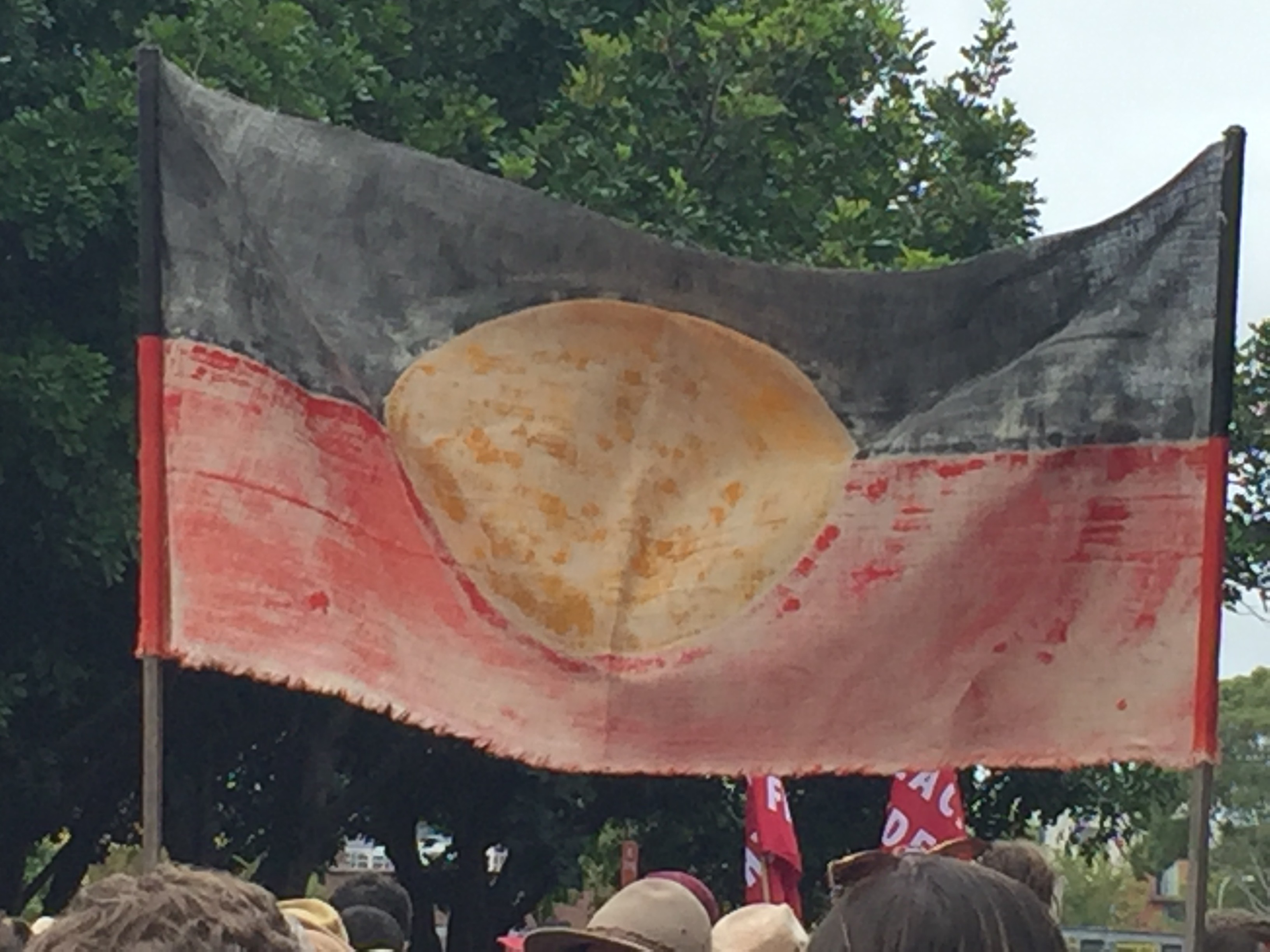
Australian Aboriginal flag, "Invasion Day" protest march, Sydney, 2018

In 1995, the Keating government advised the governor-general to give the flag official status as a flag of Australia, through a proclamation under the Flags Act. In a statement, the minister for Administrative Services argued this reflected the government's support for Aboriginal pride and reconciliation. The decision was criticised at the time by Liberal opposition leader John Howard. He stated that the recognition "would rightly be seen by many in the community not as an act of reconciliation but as a divisive gesture" and that "No matter how these flags bulk large in the affections of our indigenous people, they can only ever be symbols for one section of the Australian community." The move was also criticised by the designer of the flag, Harold Thomas, arguing that the flag "doesn't need any more recognition" and that "This move will mean that the flag has been taken over by the white man and will lose its potency as a symbol." However, although Howard was prime minister from 1996 to 2007, the proclamation remained.

The National Indigenous Advisory Committee campaigned for the Aboriginal flag to be flown at Stadium Australia during the 2000 Summer Olympics. The Olympics organisers announced that the Aboriginal flag would be flown at Olympic venues. The flag has been flown over the Sydney Harbour Bridge during the march for reconciliation of 2000 and many other events, including Australia Day. Since July 2022, the flag has been flown on the Harbour Bridge permanently, alongside the Australian national flag. On the 30th anniversary of the flag in 2001, thousands of people were involved in a ceremony where the flag was carried from the Parliament of South Australia to Victoria Square.

== Use ==
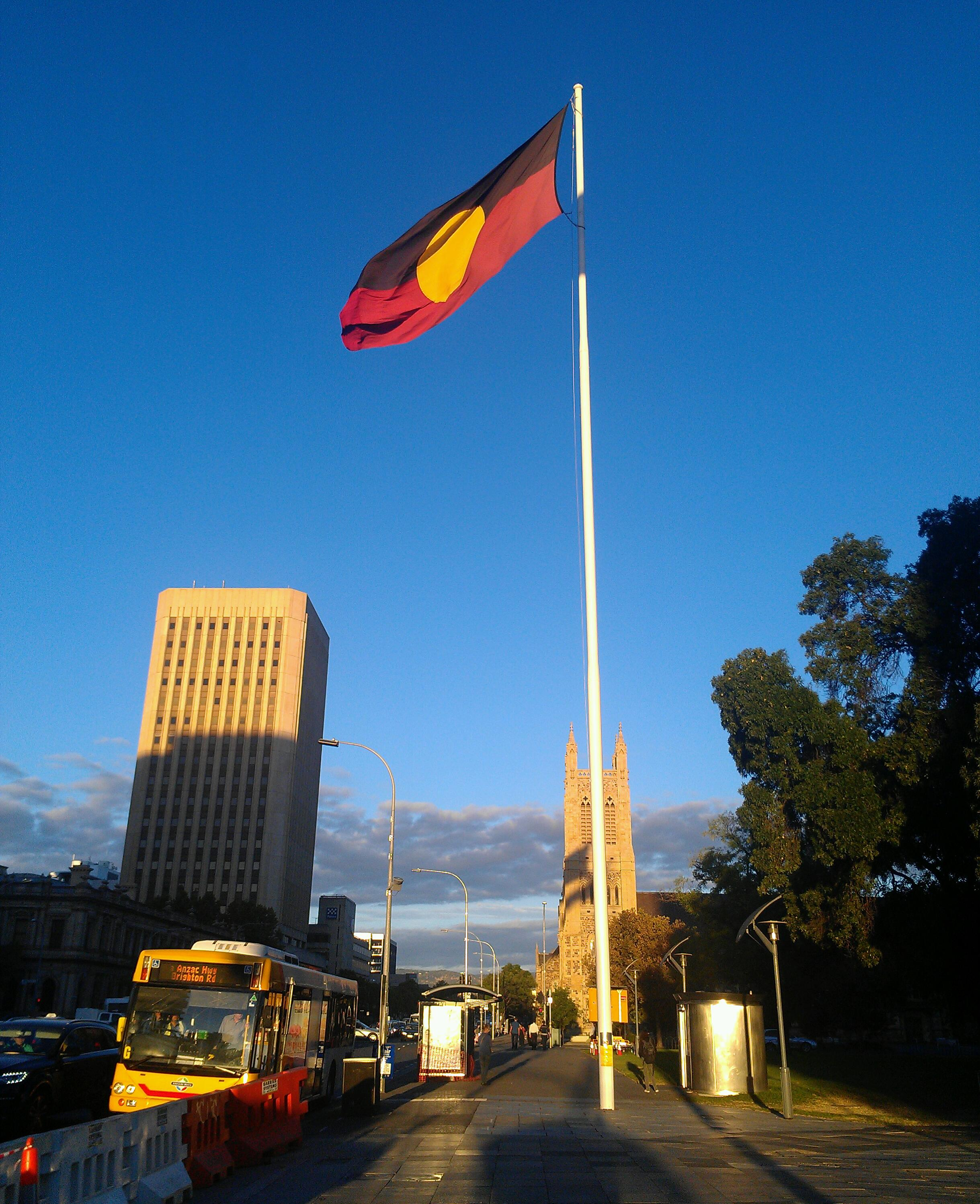
The Aboriginal flag flying in Victoria Square/Tarntanyangga, Adelaide (2013), near where the flag was first flown

=== Public buildings and locations ===
The first city council to fly the Aboriginal flag was Newcastle City Council in 1977.

On 8 July 2002, the Adelaide City Council endorsed the permanent flying of the Aboriginal flag close to the location of its first raising at Victoria Square in 1971 (now dual-named Tarntanyangga), which now flies adjacent to the Australian flag. It has also been flown in front of Adelaide Town Hall since the same date.

Various councils in Australian towns fly the Aboriginal flag from the town halls, such as Bendigo (adopted in 2005). The flag is also flown at many other public buildings such as a number of the state Parliament Houses including that of Victoria (adopted in 2015).

In April 2021, Regional NSW Police Deputy Commissioner Gary Worboys said that he would like to see the flag flown at every New South Wales Police regional police station in the state, expanding from the 12 of the 89 then flying it.

The Australian Aboriginal flag has been hoisted alongside the Australian national flag as a permanent feature of the Australian Embassy in Dublin, Ireland, since 5 March 2021.

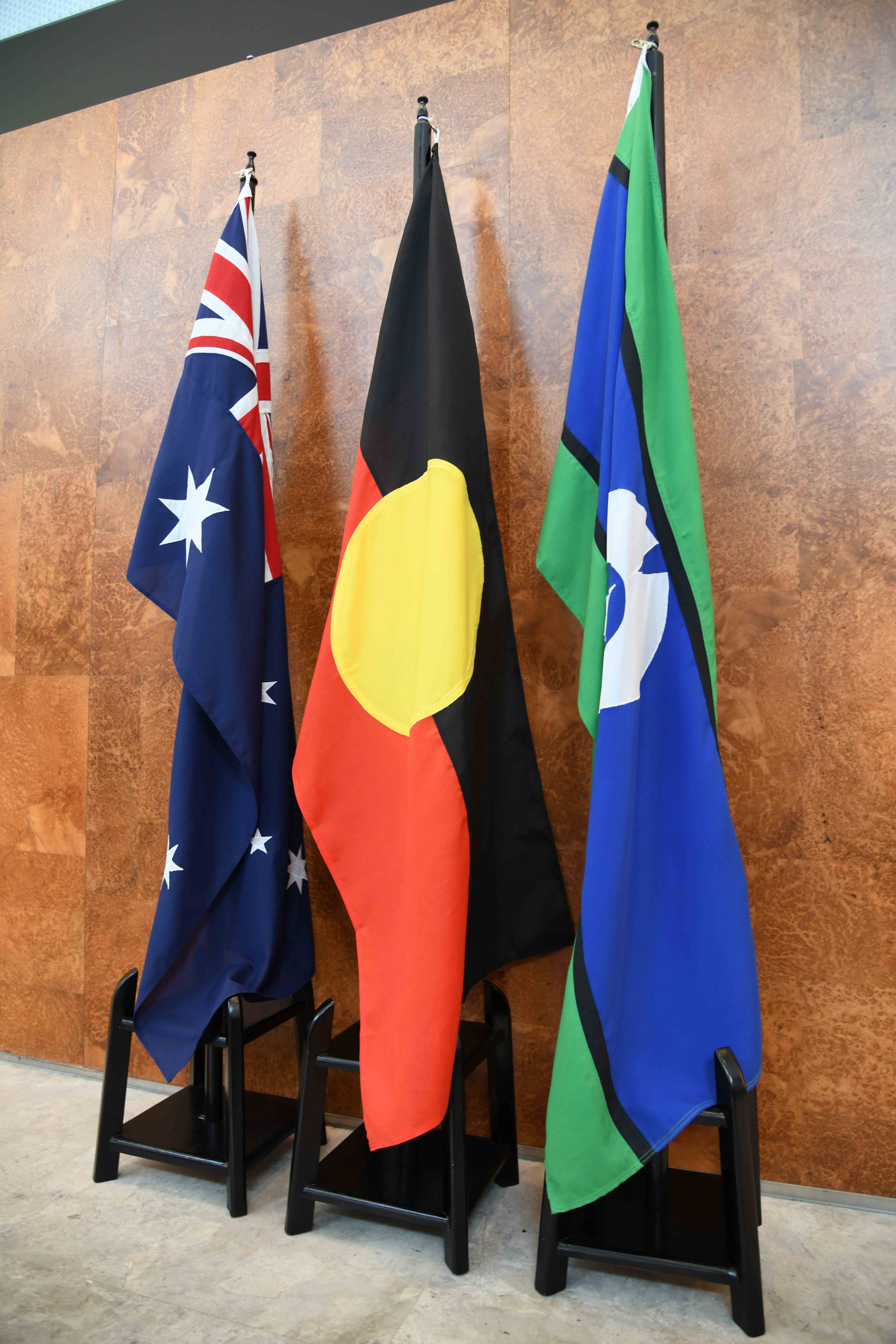
The Australian national, Aboriginal and Torres Strait Islander flags as they are often displayed at official events

Following the 2022 Australian federal election on 21 May 2022, the incoming Anthony Albanese led Labor government started displaying the Aboriginal flag and the Torres Strait Islander flag alongside the national flag at ministerial press conferences. Upon the opening of the new Parliament, both flags began to be displayed in the House of Representatives and Senate chambers.

From 27 May 2022, at the start of National Reconciliation Week, both the Aboriginal and Torres Strait Islander flags were hoisted on the front lawn of Government House, Adelaide, to be permanently flown alongside the national flag and the South Australian flag.

=== Other authorised uses ===
The sale of condoms in the colours of the Aboriginal flag won a public health award in 2005 for the initiative's success in improving safe sex practices among young Indigenous people.

Aboriginal-designed emojis titled Indigemojis and including the flag on several designs, were released in December 2019 via an app, with the permission of Harold Thomas.

=== Proposed, unauthorised and other uses ===
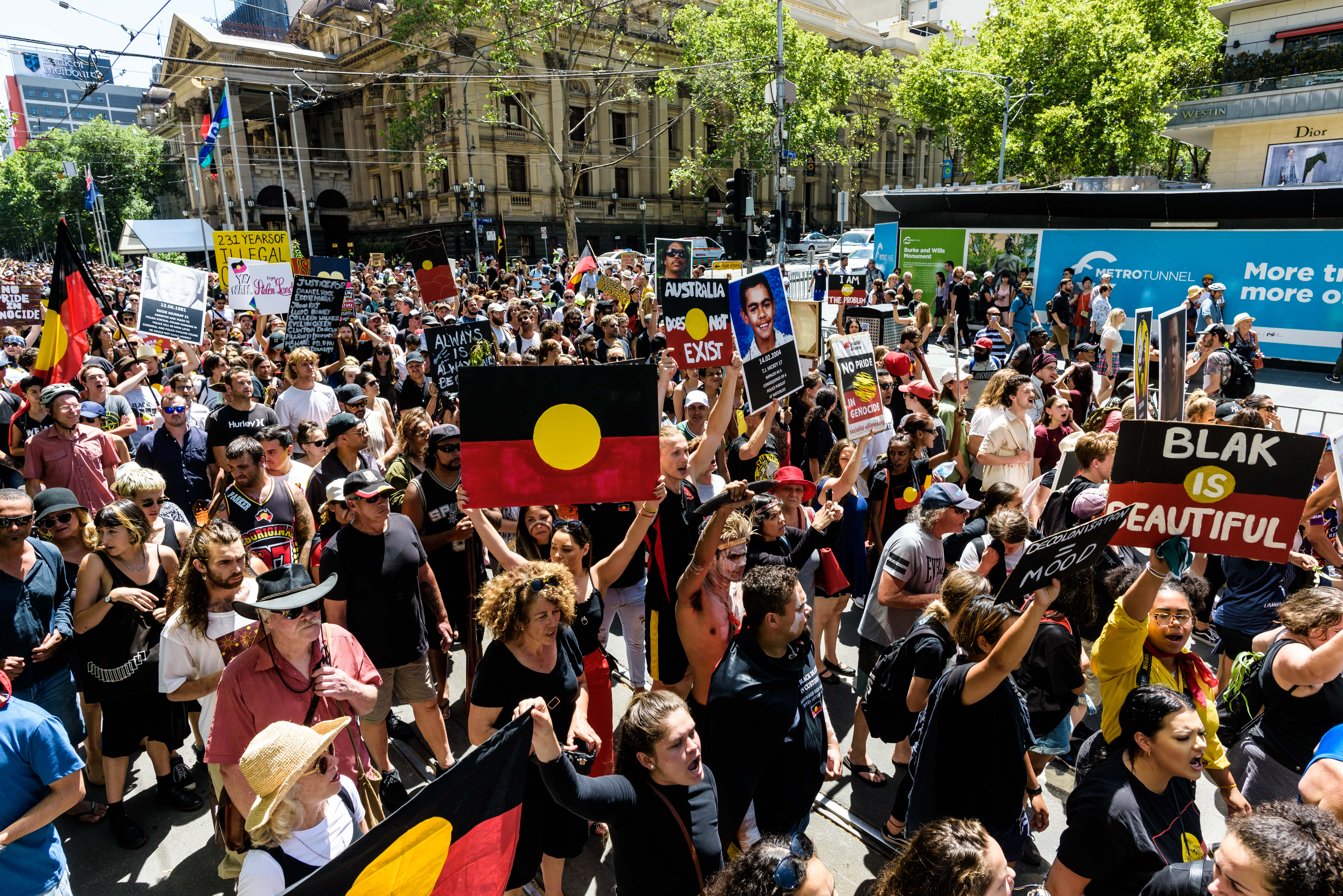
A number of Aboriginal flags at an Invasion Day Protest in Melbourne, 2019

The Aboriginal flag is often included in various proposed designs to replace the current Australian Flag. One proposal has been to substitute the Union Flag, located in the canton of the Australian Flag, with the Aboriginal flag. Harold Thomas said of this idea: "I wouldn′t reject it out of hand, but I could make a decision to say no. Our flag is not a secondary thing. It stands on its own, not to be placed as an adjunct to any other thing. It shouldn't be treated that way."

In the science fiction film Event Horizon, actor Sam Neill, himself a New Zealander, requested this flag for use on his sleeve as the way he thought the Australian flag should look in 2047, which incorporated the Aboriginal flag.. This flag was originally designed by Talc Alf (Cornelius Johan Alferink) in 1988.

The Australian Aboriginal flag is celebrated in the painting The First Supper (1988) by Susan Dorothea White where the central figure is an Aboriginal woman who displays the flag on her T-shirt.

The flag was to be part of the logo on Google Australia's home page on Australia Day 2010, but the company was forced to modify the design due to its creator Harold Thomas demanding payment if Google were to use it.

The anti-Islamic group Reclaim Australia used the flag at their protests in 2015, which was condemned by the flag's creator, Harold Thomas, who called it "idiotic".

== Copyright ==
The flag is considered to be Public Domain in the United States, however Australia has a very low threshold for copyright, making it copyrightable and therefore copyrighted.

In Australia copyright in the flag has been subject to controversy, as to original and ongoing ownership of the copyright.

=== 1997: copyright granted to Thomas ===
In 1997, in the case of Thomas v Brown and Tennant, the Federal Court of Australia declared that Harold Thomas was the owner of copyright in the design of the Australian Aboriginal flag, and thus the flag has protection under copyright law of Australia. Thomas had sought legal recognition of his ownership and compensation following the Federal Government's 1995 proclamation of the design, and his claim was contested by two others, George Brown and James Tennant. After winning copyright, Thomas awarded rights solely to Carroll & Richardson – Flagworld Pty Ltd and Birubi Art Pty Ltd for the manufacture and marketing of the flag and of products featuring the flag's image.

In November 2018, Thomas granted WAM Clothing (which is co-owned by Birubi Art owner Ben Wooster) a licence for the use of the flag on clothing. In June 2019, it was reported that WAM Clothing had demanded that Aboriginal-owned businesses stop selling clothing that featured the flag. They also sent notices to the NRL and AFL about their use of the flag on Indigenous round jerseys and guernseys. In June 2020, after a prominent Aboriginal footballer began selling WAM-licensed teeshirts bearing the flag through his own website, Aboriginal former senator Nova Peris, a leader of a "free the flag" campaign, wrote to the Governor-General, requesting his support for divesting WAM of the copyright.

After consultation with its Aboriginal and Torres Strait Islander Advisory Council, the AFL did not enter into a commercial agreement with WAM in 2020, in line with general Aboriginal sentiment on the issue. In August 2020, Ken Wyatt, Minister for Indigenous Australians, said that he would love to see the flag freely used across Australia, and former AFL player Michael Long said its absence would have a negative effect on the players in the Sir Doug Nicholls Indigenous Round. Wyatt encouraged spectators to bring flags to the games, beginning in Darwin on 22 August 2020.

=== 2022: copyright transfer to Commonwealth ===
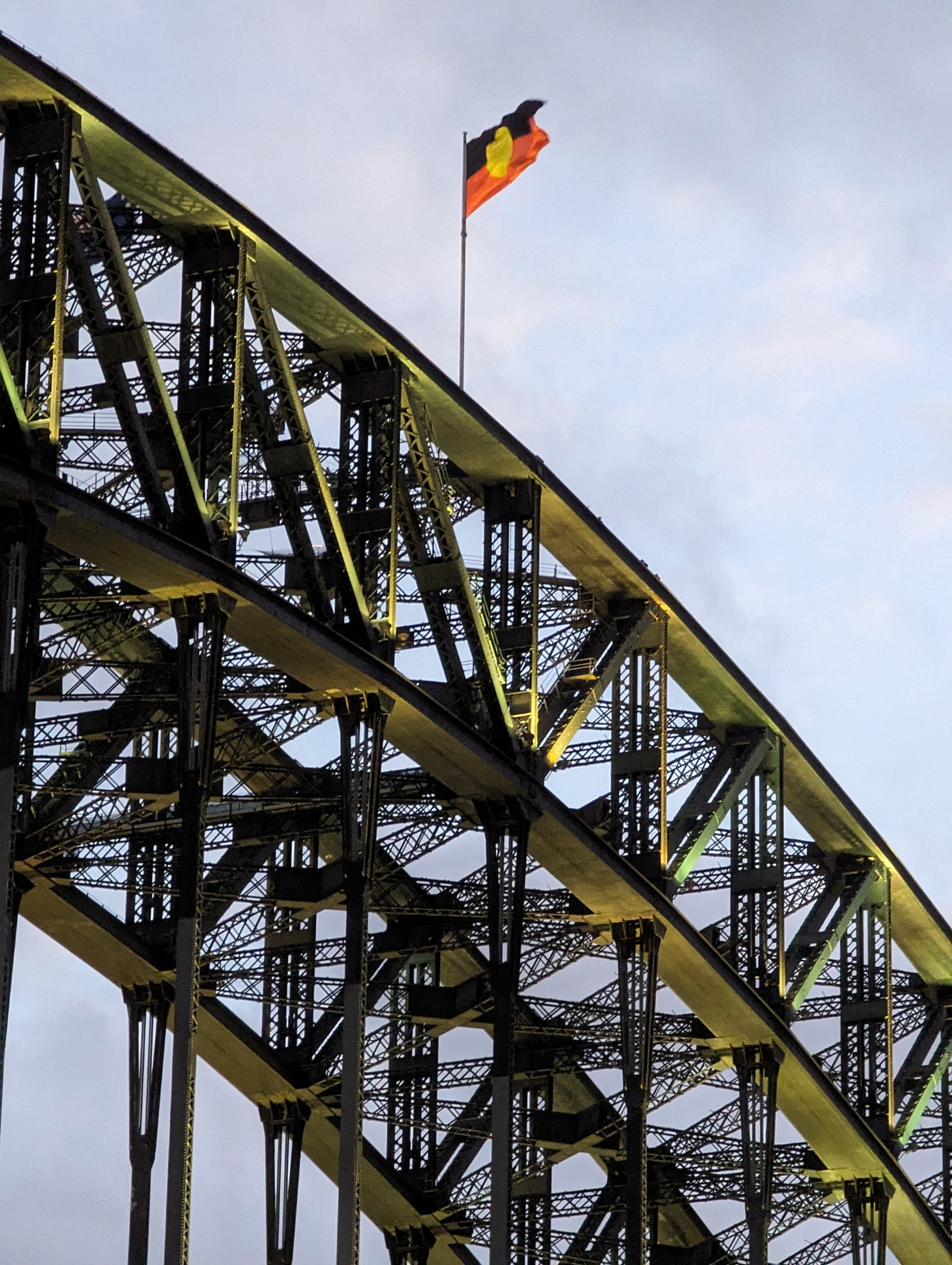
On the Sydney Harbour Bridge

On 24 January 2022, the Commonwealth government announced, after more than three years of confidential negotiations, that Thomas had transferred the copyright in the flag to the Commonwealth. The federal government paid $20.05m to Thomas and licence holders (including WAM Clothing and Carroll and Richardson Flagworld) to extinguish existing licences and secure copyright. As part of the copyright transfer, Thomas retained moral rights over the flag (which include the right to be identified as its creator). Following the copyright transfer, Carroll and Richardson Flagworld continued to be the exclusive manufacturer, although individuals may make copies for personal use.

The Commonwealth agreed to fund a scholarship in Thomas's name for Indigenous students to further the development of Indigenous governance and leadership and an online education portal on the flag's history. An original painting by Thomas detailing the transfer of copyright would be "displayed in a prominent location" by the Commonwealth. All royalties from the copyright are to be transferred to the National Aborigines and Islanders Day Observance Committee, and $2m would be devoted to establishing a not-for-profit organisation that will make periodic payments for activities related to the flag.

About the use of the flag, the government statement reads:

The Aboriginal Flag will now be managed in a similar manner to the Australian National Flag, where its use is free, but must be presented in a respectful and dignified way. All Australians can now put the Aboriginal Flag on apparel such as sports jerseys and shirts, it can be painted on sports grounds, included on websites, in paintings and other artworks, used digitally and in any other medium without having to ask for permission or pay a fee.

Many Aboriginal people celebrated the freeing of the flag; however, Bronwyn Carlson, Professor of Indigenous Studies and Director of the Centre for Global Indigenous Futures at Macquarie University, expressed a contrary opinion, suggesting that to "free" the flag for all and sundry may demean it as a symbol of Aboriginal identity and history. She wrote in The Conversation: "the Aboriginal flag has always been our flag. We didn't need an act of parliament to recognise its significance." Some Indigenous people are not happy to see the federal government have control of the flag, rather than an Indigenous organisation, and law professor Isabella Alexander said that some legal questions remained, for as long as details of the agreement were still commercial-in-confidence. Upon the release by the Australian government of the Assignment Deed following an FOI application, David J. Brennan has identified a likelihood that the Australian copyright in the 1971 flag as an artistic work expired upon transfer to the Commonwealth.

The flag's current legal status was debated in an Australian Senate estimates committee in mid‑February 2022, when it was also revealed that the Morrison government had paid $13.75m to Thomas to assume copyright, and also paid $6.3m to two non-Indigenous businesses which held licences to use the flag. These companies are WAM Clothing, which received $5.2m, and Wooster Holdings, which was paid $1.1m. Interests in both companies are held by Gold Coast businessman Ben Wooster, former director of Birubi Art (which was fined $2.3m in 2018 for selling fake Aboriginal art).

== See also ==
- Flags of Australia
- Ethnic flag
