= Seven Social Sins =

Mohandas Gandhi's list of negative qualities

Seven Social Sins is a list by Frederic Donaldson that Mohandas Karamchand Gandhi published in his weekly newspaper Young India on 22 October 1925. Later he gave this same list written on a piece of paper to his grandson, Arun Gandhi, on their final day together shortly before his assassination.

Gandhi listed the sins as:

1. Wealth without work.
2. Pleasure without conscience.
3. Knowledge without character.
4. Commerce without morality.
5. Science without humanity.
6. Religion without sacrifice.
7. Politics without principle.

== History ==
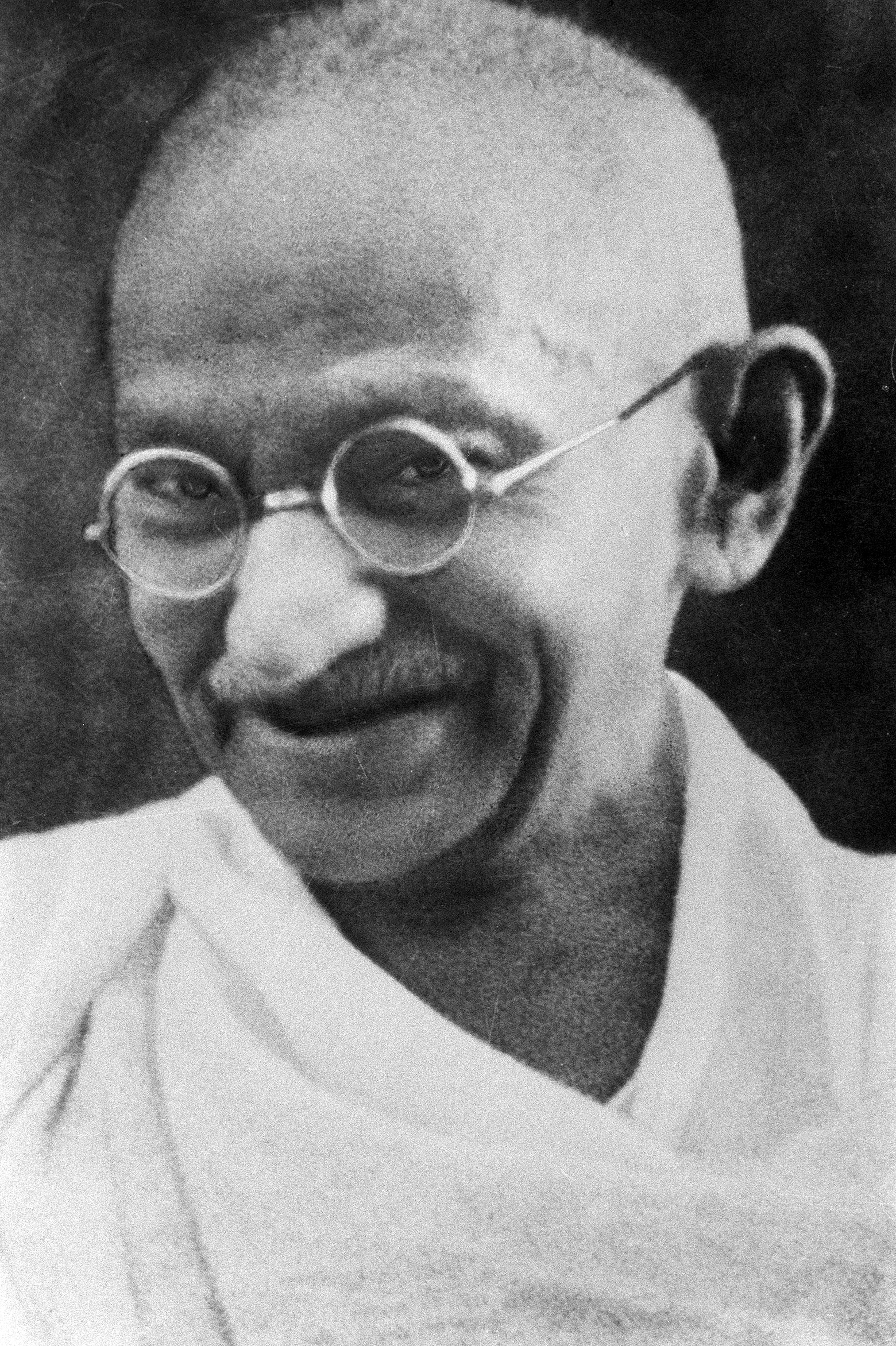
Mohandas Gandhi published the list of "Seven Social Sins" in 1925. (1940s photo)

The list was published by Mohandas Karamchand Gandhi in his weekly newspaper Young India on 22 October 1925. An almost identical list had been published six months earlier in England in a sermon at Westminster Abbey by Fredrick Lewis Donaldson. Gandhi wrote that a correspondent whom he called a "fair friend" had sent the list: "The... fair friend wants readers of Young India to know, if they do not already, the following seven social sins," (the list was then provided). After the list, Gandhi wrote that "Naturally, the friend does not want the readers to know these things merely through the intellect but to know them through the heart so as to avoid them." This was the entirety of Gandhi's commentary on the list when he first published it.

== Influence ==
In the decades since its first publication, the list has been widely cited and discussed. Some books have also focused on the seven sins or been structured around them:

- Eknath Easwaran (1989). The Compassionate Universe: The Power of the Individual to Heal the Environment (listed, discussed, and served as chapter structure for book)
- Stephen Covey (1989). Principle-Centered Leadership ( Chapter 7: Seven Deadly Sins (p. 87 to 93).
- Frank Woolever (2011) Gandhi List of Social Sins: Lessons in Truth

Many books have discussed the sins more briefly:

- Peter J. Gomes (2007). The scandalous gospel of Jesus: What's so good about the good news? Page 122 states "Years ago, I was much encouraged when I discovered that Gandhi had a list of seven social sins that, if not resisted, could destroy both persons and countries. .... We live in a world in which these social sins flourish as much today as they did in Gandhi's time; surely the battle against them is still worth waging."
- Adam Taylor (2010). Mobilizing hope: Faith-inspired activism for a post-civil rights generation Page 155 mentions two of the social sins, stating "The recent economic collapse (now referred to as the Great Recession) reminds me of two social sins from Gandhi's famous list of seven deadly social sins. Gandhi warned about the dangers of wealth without work and commerce without morality...."
- Thomas Weber (2011). "Gandhi's Moral Economics: the Sins of Wealth Without Work and Commerce Without Morality." Page 141 lists the sins and their date of publication, stating that "These and many of Gandhi's own writings make it quite clear that the Mahatma did not compartmentalize his life. For him, economics together with politics, morality and religion formed an indivisible whole."
- Rana P. B. Singh (2006). "Mohandas (Mahatma) Gandhi." Page 107 lists the sins and gives a 2 or 3 sentence explanation of each, stating "these are ideals, but they are more relevant in the present era of desperation and could easily be accepted."

They have also been anthologized:

- Anil Dutt Misra (2008). Inspiring Thoughts Of Mahatma Gandhi

In 2025, Ahir Shah made a BBC Radio 4 series, 7 Blunders of the World, based on the list.

== Politics without principle ==
Regarding "politics without principle", Gandhi said having politics without truth(s) to justly dictate the action creates chaos, which ultimately leads to violence. Gandhi called these missteps "passive violence", ‘which fuels the active violence of crime, rebellion, and war.’ He said, "We could work 'til doomsday to achieve peace and would get nowhere as long as we ignore passive violence in our world."

Politics is literally defined as, "The struggle in any group for power that will give one or more persons the ability to make decisions for the larger group."

Mohandas Gandhi defined principle as, "the expression of perfection, and as imperfect beings like us cannot practice perfection, we devise every moment limits of its compromise in practice."

There are many different types of regimes in the world whose politics differ. Based on Gandhi’s Blunder Politics without Principle, a regime type might be more of a root of violence than another because one regime has more principle than the other. Regimes have different types of fighting and aggression tactics, each desiring different outcomes.

This difference affects the actions taken by political heads in countries across the globe. Gandhi wrote, "An unjust law is itself a species of violence." The aggression of one country on another may be rooted in the government's creation of an unjust law. For example, a war of irredentism fought for one state to reclaim territory that was lost due to a law promoting ethnic cleansing.

Principle in one country could easily be a crime in another. This difference leads one to believe that the root of violence is inevitably present somewhere in the world. "Politics without Principle" will inevitably take place throughout time.

"I object to violence because when it appears to do good, the good is only temporary; the evil it does is permanent."

This list grew from Gandhi's search for the roots of violence. He called these "acts of passive violence". Preventing these is the best way to prevent oneself or one's society from reaching a point of violence, according to Gandhi.

To this list, Arun Gandhi added an eighth blunder, "rights without responsibilities". According to Arun Gandhi, the idea behind the first blunder originates from the feudal practice of Zamindari. He also suggests that the first and the second blunders are interrelated.

== Arun Gandhi description as "Seven Blunders" ==
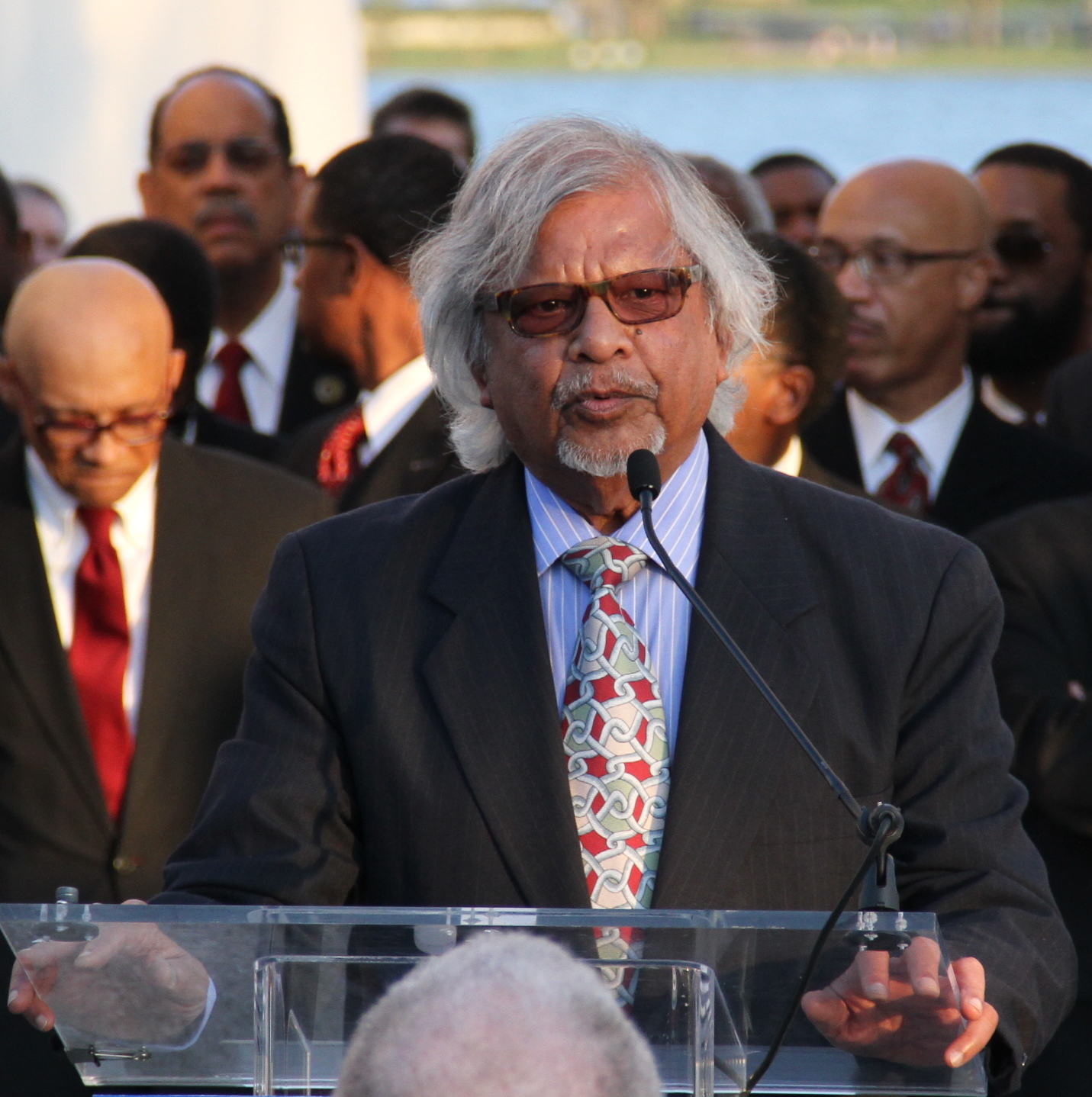
Arun Gandhi, who was personally given the list by his grandfather, Mohandas Gandhi, has described it as a list of "Seven Blunders of the World" that lead to violence.

More recently Mohandas Gandhi's list of negative qualities has also been described by his grandson as "Seven Blunders of the World". Examples of description under this heading include:

- Knickerbocker, Brad (1 February 1995). "Gandhi grandson pursues peace". Christian Science Monitor. p. 14. ISSN 0882-7729. (sidebar) (profile of Arun Gandhi that gives a list entitled "Mohandas Gandhi's 'Seven Blunders of the World,'" and states that "The last time Arun saw his grandfather, the old man slipped the boy a piece of paper with a list of what have come to be known as Gandhi's 'Seven Blunders of the World' that lead to violence." It also states that Arun Gandhi "would make 'Rights without responsibilities' No. 8 on his grandfather's list of 'blunders.'")
- Gilbert, Steven W. (1996). "Making the most of a slow revolution". Change: The Magazine of Higher Learning. 28 (2). Taylor & Francis: 10–23. doi:10.1080/00091383.1996.9937745. ISSN 0009-1383. JSTOR 40177995. OCLC 10647084. (p. 15, gives the list entitled "Gandhi's 'Seven Blunders of the World' that Lead to Violence," plus "8. Rights without responsibilities" credited to Arun Gandhi.)
- Arrien, Angeles (2001). "Introduction." In: Arrien, Angeles (2001). Working together : Diversity as opportunity. San Francisco: Berrett-Koehler Publishers. pp. 1–11. ISBN 1576751562. "Seven Blunders of the world." (the list was entitled "Seven Blunders of the World" and described as having been given to Arun Gandhi by his grandfather)

== See also ==
- Seven deadly sins – Set of vices in Christian theology
- Samyama – Meditation technique in Yoga
- Sattva – Hindu philosophical concept
