= The Seven Deadly Sins of Modern Times =

1993 painting by Susan Dorothea White

- Artist: Susan Dorothea White
- Year: 1993

The Seven Deadly Sins of Modern Times (1993) is an acrylic painting on a wooden table by the contemporary Australian artist Susan Dorothea White, where she proposes that today's deadly sins are the opposite of the original ones.

Inspired by the composition and design of The Seven Deadly Sins and the Four Last Things by Hieronymus Bosch, White has described her depiction of the inverses; for example, gluttony is supplanted by "dieting", and "sucking up" stands in for envy.

In the depiction of each of these deadly sins is an animal or plant which has been introduced to Australia to ill effect, as the cockroach represents squandering and a feral water buffalo demonstrates indifference. Instead of the eye of God which Bosch placed in the center of his design, White has incorporated an enlargement of the iris of her pet cat, which represents Gaia, with the rubric "The Eye of Gaia Sees All". The artist has also produced a woodcut of the same title and similar composition and another large acrylic painting on a wooden table The Seven Deadly Isms - the latter has been described as a "Boschian extravaganza ... depicting such contemporary obsessions as Materialism and Workaholism in intricate figurative tableaux".

To view the Seven Deadly Sins of Modern Times properly requires that you walk around it and view each of the sections, which are artfully integrated. The center is a nocturnal eye with the inscriptions "The Seven Deadly Sins" on one side, and "The Eye of Gaia Sees All" on the other. The sections are described below after a short, general definition from Princeton's WordNet.

== Self effacement ==
Self-effacement is defined as withdrawing into the background, making yourself inconspicuous.

The section shows three activities in one room:

- a person with their face in a newspaper clipped to a line with many other newspapers after it. One hand is on the paper and the other is throwing the previous one away.
- a person on their knees reading by candle light a book resting on a toilet, wiping tears from their eyes. The toilet paper is unfurled onto the floor where a violin rests and its bow
- a person on their knees working on a wig made of thorns on the floor, where their old hair lies in their hands as they stare intently at it and play with it

== Celibacy ==
Celibacy is defined as either abstaining from sexual relations (as because of religious vows) or being in an unmarried status.

It shows a naked couple. The woman's hand gestures "stop", and she is looking away from him. A cactus grows around her feet. Above the bed is a picture of a saint, and above that a cross. He holds a sex toy and has an erection. Because they each have one foot on the rug, it is a sign that they are married.

== Workaholism ==
Workaholism is defined as compulsiveness about working.

It shows a person in bad ergonomics bent over a small computer screen typing on the keyboard. Another person stares intently into the dark pit of a cylindrical blue object on the floor while standing under a ledge making that special section of flooring like a desk for them. There are stacks of books and papers on the floor and a shelf with more of the same. It is after midnight. A furnace with irons in the fire cooks a steaming pot, and more tools are on the ground.

== Dieting ==
Dieting is defined as the act of restricting your food intake or your intake of particular foods.

It shows an anorexic person with both hands gesturing "stop", sitting at a table with all kinds of food, healthy and unhealthy. They're pushing away a turkey with their foot. A rat with his tail on the cheese nibbles at the cupcakes. They are looking at an apple lying on the floor near a menu on a chalk board. A skeleton in a "slimming contest" dances on a stage; two large menus are prominent and contain telling descriptions of the meals and specials.

== Squandering ==
Squandering is defined as spending resources lavishly and wastefully.

It shows a person pouring water into a sink. The water is a shower head. In the sink is a person killing "the goose that laid the golden eggs", and a person walking into a casino, money falling out of their pocket. A hand is throwing money into the sink. Roaches crawl on a gambling form.

== Sucking up ==
To suck up is defined as either to try to gain favor by cringing or flattering, or to ingratiate oneself to another, often with insincere behavior.

It shows the managing director of an office heading upstairs while another is holding their pant leg and licking the behind. A person sits at a table sucking up a toad held by a utensil, with more on the plate. A large toad with a pink bow on its head is leaving the office.

== Indifference ==
Indifferences is defined variously as the trait of lacking enthusiasm for or interest in things generally; the trait of remaining calm and seeming not to care, a casual lack of concern; apathy demonstrated by an absence of emotional reactions; and unbiased impartial unconcern.

It shows a building labeled "Charity" with wide inviting steps leading to an entrance with no door on it. Two artworks adorn its side: on the right an aging cucumber, on the left a biological human heart. On the sidewalk are three images: on the left is an Asiatic buffalo wading in water up to its neck; on the right is a calculator; front and center is a pedestal the height of the steps with a person standing on it, icicles dripping from their suit of cloths and from their head. Their arms are folded and their weight shifted to their right leg. Their image is the foreground of the door, and they are looking rightward toward the heart.
