= The First Supper =

1988 painting by Susan Dorothea White

- Artist: Susan Dorothea White
- Year: 1988
- Medium: Acrylic on wood panel
- Subject: The Last Supper
- Dimensions: 1.2 m × 2.4 m (47 in × 94 in)

The First Supper (1988) is a work of art by Susan Dorothea White, based on Leonardo da Vinci's 1490s painting The Last Supper. White's painting is acrylic on a large wood panel (1.2 x 2.4 m) and, in a challenge to the patriarchal concept of thirteen men on one side of a table, shows 13 women from all regions of the world; in the position of Leonardo's Christ figure is an Aboriginal Australian woman wearing a T-shirt with the Australian Aboriginal flag. One woman seen is in the position of Judas. She dines on a hamburger and Coca-Cola, while all the other women are seen with a bread roll and glass of water. The painting toured Australia in the Blake Prize for Religious Art exhibition in 1988, where it was ridiculed, before being exhibited in the artist's solo exhibition in Amsterdam, where it featured in the Dutch art journal Kunstbeeld: "The work shows clearly Susan White's thinking about human rights. It should be mentioned here that she sometimes places her many faceted talent at the service of the struggle for human rights."

== See also ==
- Last Supper in Christian art
