= Sir Doug Nicholls Round =

Annual Australian rules football event

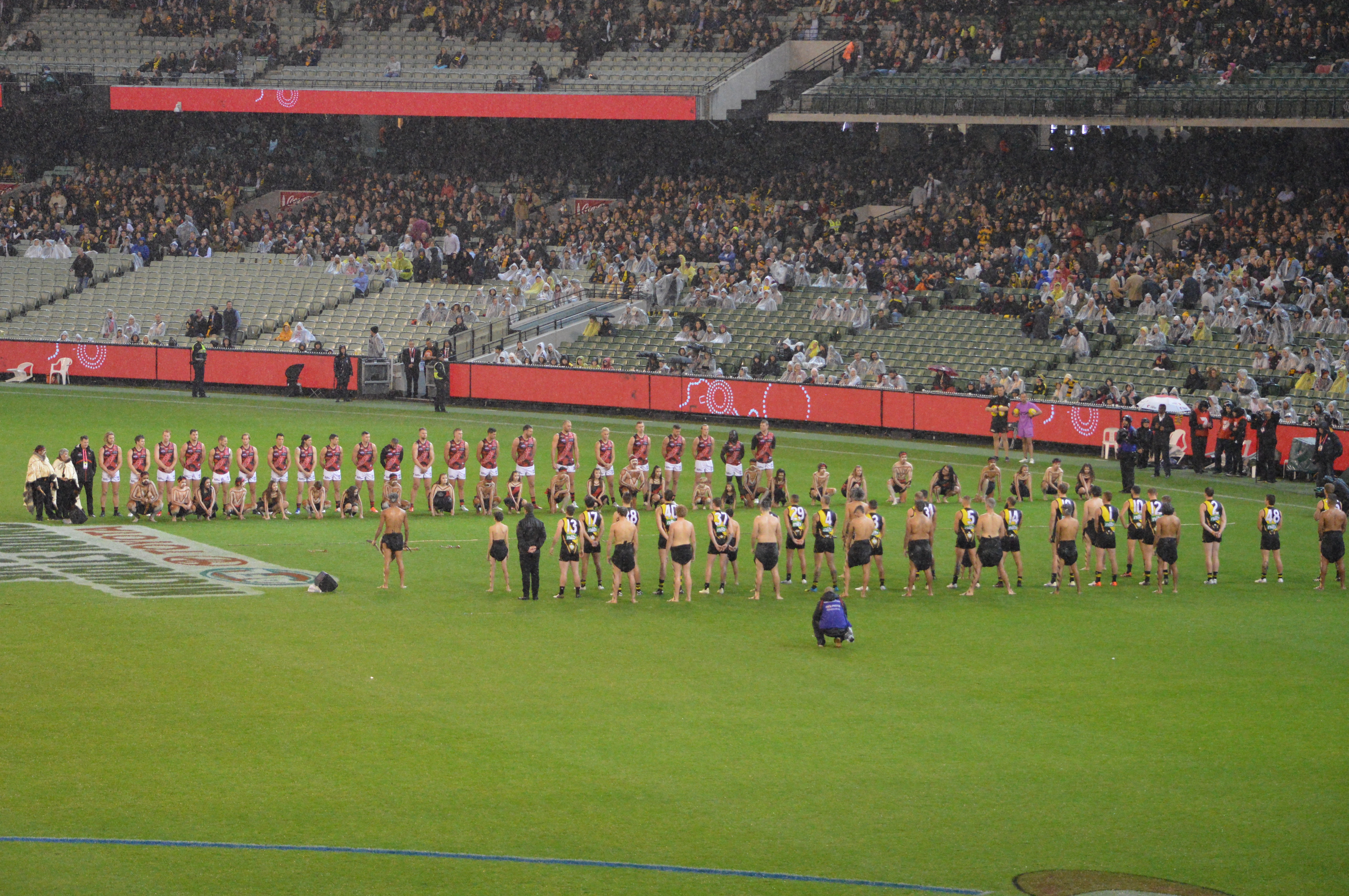
- Players observe a war cry representing each club and performed by Indigenous groups in 2019
- Sport: Australian rules football
- First season: 2007
- Country: Australia
- Related competitions: AFL

The Sir Doug Nicholls Round is an annual event in the Australian Football League which celebrates the culture of Indigenous Australians and the contribution of Indigenous Australian players to the sport.

First established in 2007 as the Indigenous Round, the event was renamed in honour of pioneering Indigenous player and politician Sir Doug Nicholls in 2016. The event was originally staged over a single round of home-and-away matches; since 2019, it has been staged over two rounds. The centrepiece of the Sir Doug Nicholls Round is the Dreamtime at the 'G match, played annually between Richmond and Essendon at the Melbourne Cricket Ground on a Saturday night during the round.

Clubs adopt Indigenous symbols during the round, including wearing specially designed guernseys featuring Indigenous art, and adopting Indigenous versions of their club names.

The AFL Women's competition has an equivalent event, named the Indigenous Round, staged over two rounds each season.

== History ==
The organised Indigenous round has its origins in two stand-alone fixtures from the early 2000s. The first, the Marn Grook Match, was an annual fixture between Sydney and Essendon in Sydney to contest the Marn Grook Trophy; named after the Indigenous football game of marn grook, it was first played during National Reconciliation Week in 2002, and its first iteration was the inaugural AFL game played at Stadium Australia. The second was the annual Dreamtime at the 'G match, first played between Richmond and Essendon in their home-and-away match played during NAIDOC Week in 2005. At both games, the clubs staged events and pre-match celebrations with the aim of recognising Indigenous culture and the contribution of all Indigenous players to the AFL.

In 2007, the annual Indigenous Round was established by the AFL, extending the celebration of Indigenous culture and players to all matches across the round. The inaugural round was staged from 25 to 27 May 2007, recognising the 40th anniversary of the 1967 Australian referendum (Aboriginals), as well as coinciding with the National Day of Healing on 26 May and National Reconciliation Week from 27 May to 3 June; the round is scheduled on or around that calendar week every year. The Dreamtime at the 'G match has served as the central event of each Indigenous Round since its inception, played on the round's Saturday night until 2024 and on its Friday night thereafter. The Marn Grook Match continued to be contested in Sydney's annual home match against Essendon outside the Indigenous Round until 2013; since 2014, the match has been incorporated into the Indigenous Round and is contested between Sydney and one of its Indigenous Round opponents.

In 2016, the round was renamed after Sir Doug Nicholls, pioneering Indigenous player who had played for Fitzroy in the 1930s, who served as governor of South Australia, and who is the only VFL player of any race to have been knighted. In 2019, the event was extended to cover two consecutive weeks of the season; both rounds are still known as by the singular name Sir Doug Nicholls Round.

In 2021, the AFL Women's competition first introduced its Indigenous Round, also covering two weeks of its home-and-away season. The women's round is not named for Nicholls, retaining the name Indigenous Round.

== Observances ==
=== Guernseys ===
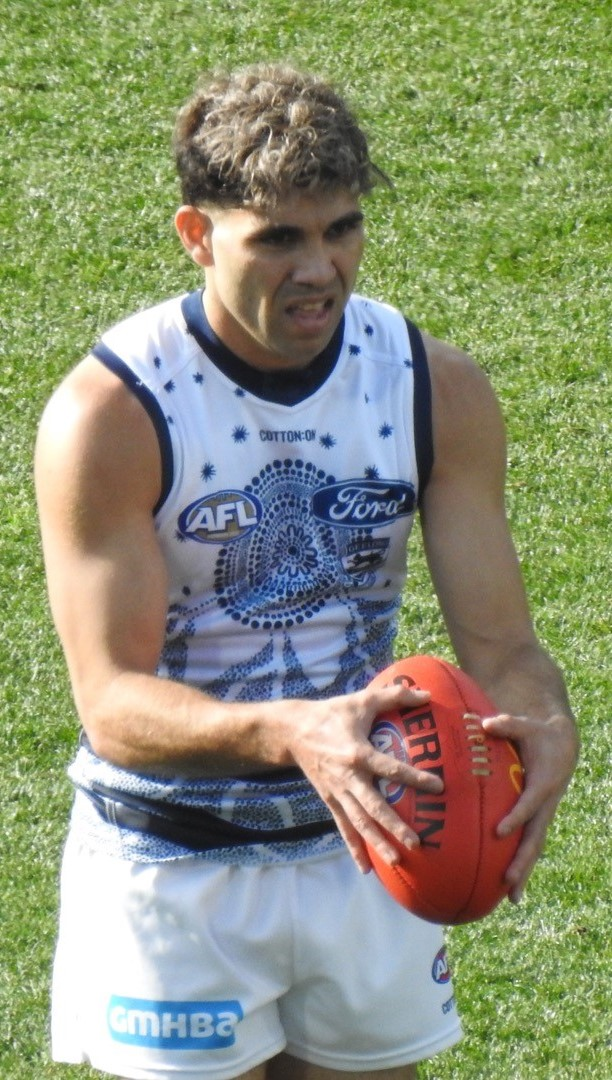
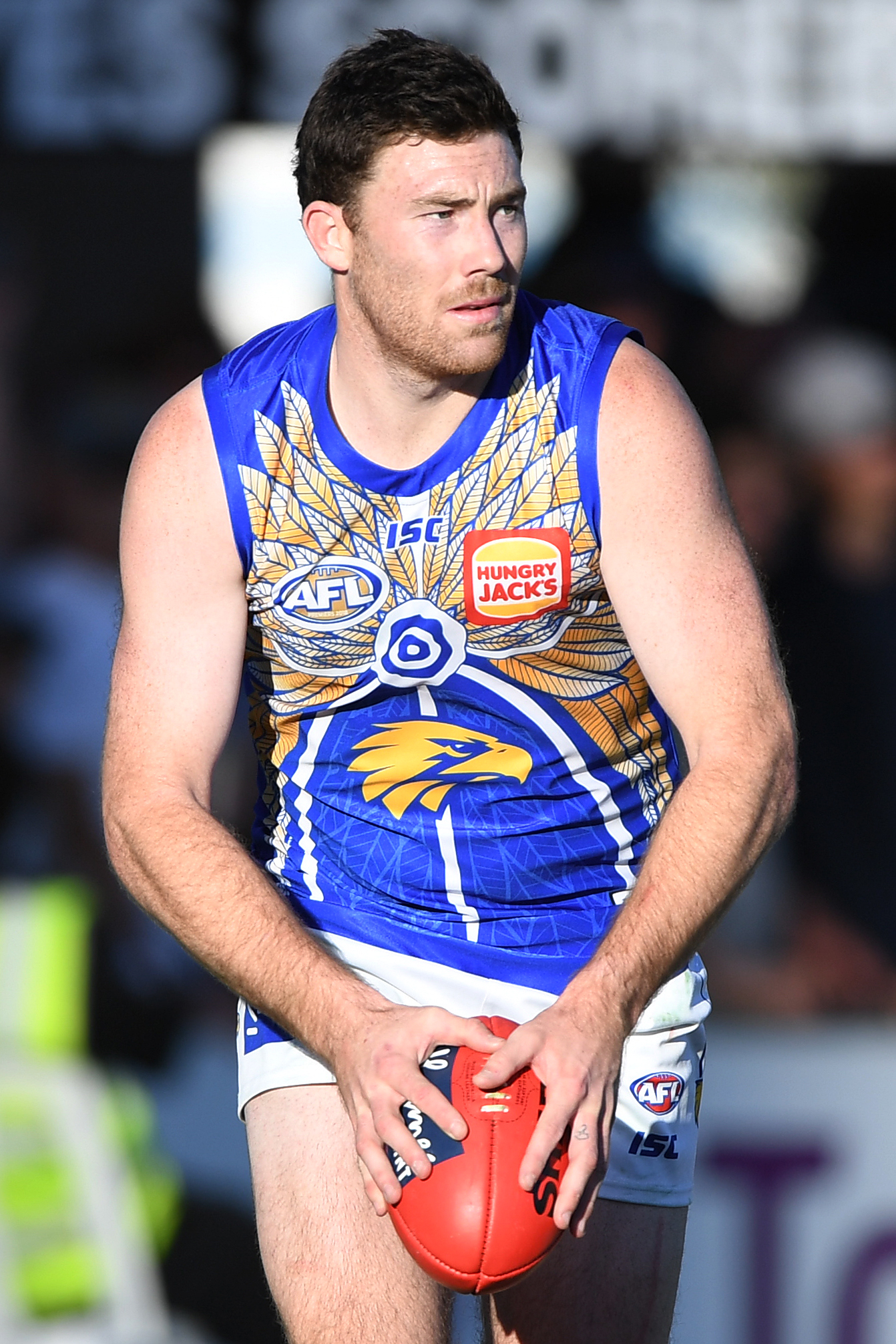
Tyson Stengle (Geelong) and Jeremy McGovern (West Coast) in Sir Doug Nicholls Round guernseys.

Each year, each club wears a specially commissioned Indigenous guernsey during the rounds, each of which is an Indigenous artwork based on the club's usual guernsey design. In most cases, one or more new guernsey designs are created each year for the occasion, often designed by one of the club's Indigenous players or an artist connected to the club. Richmond was the first club to wear a special Indigenous guernsey, adding Indigenous patterns to its gold sash for the Dreamtime at the 'G match starting in 2011; in 2013, Fremantle wore its first indigenous guernsey and Adelaide wore its normal guernsey design amended to the black, yellow and red colours of the Aboriginal flag; the current practice was then adopted by all clubs starting from the 2014 season. The umpires also wear indigenous shirt designs, first doing so in 2015.

In 2020, the league took a position in the Aboriginal flag copyright issue, deciding not to enter a commercial agreement with the clothing company which owned the copyright over its use on clothing following consultation with its Aboriginal and Torres Strait Islander Advisory Council. The Commonwealth later acquired the copyright to the flag in 2022 and it can now be used on guernseys without charge, the flag has not returned to guernseys as of 2023.

=== Indigenous club names ===
Since 2022, clubs have rebranded during the Sir Doug Nicholls and AFLW Indigenous Rounds, adopting Indigenous names which they use in place of their usual location names throughout. Melbourne was the first club to do this in 2022, and as of 2024 there are six clubs which have adopted the practice. Names are developed in consultation with local indigenous groups and experts. The names and years of use are summarised below.

Club	Indigenous name	First year	Language	Meaning or Translation
Adelaide	Kuwarna	2024	Kaurna	Crows
Fremantle	Walyalup	2023	Noongar	The area around Fremantle (literally "place of the woylie")
Melbourne	Naarm	2022	Woiwurrung	The area of Melbourne and its surrounds
Port Adelaide	Yartapuulti	2023	Kaurna	The land surrounding the Port River (literally "the place of sleep")
St Kilda	Euro-Yroke	2024	Boonwurrung	The area of St Kilda (literally "grinding stone place)
West Coast	Waalitj Marawar	2024	Noongar	Eagle(s) of the west

=== Matches in the Northern Territory ===
Since 2007, different clubs have had deals in place to play one or two games per year in the Northern Territory, either at Marrara Oval in Darwin, or Traeger Park in Alice Springs. The demographic proportion and Australian rules football participation rates of Indigenous people in the Northern Territory are higher than any of the states, and it has thus been common, although not universal, for some of these games to be held during the Sir Doug Nicholls Round. In 2020, Marrara Oval hosted the Dreamtime at the 'G match, when the city of Melbourne was unable to due to a COVID-19 pandemic lockdown; and the 2024 AFLW Dreamtime match was fixtured for Marrara Oval, with the league in discussions to make this a permanent fixture.

=== Other ===
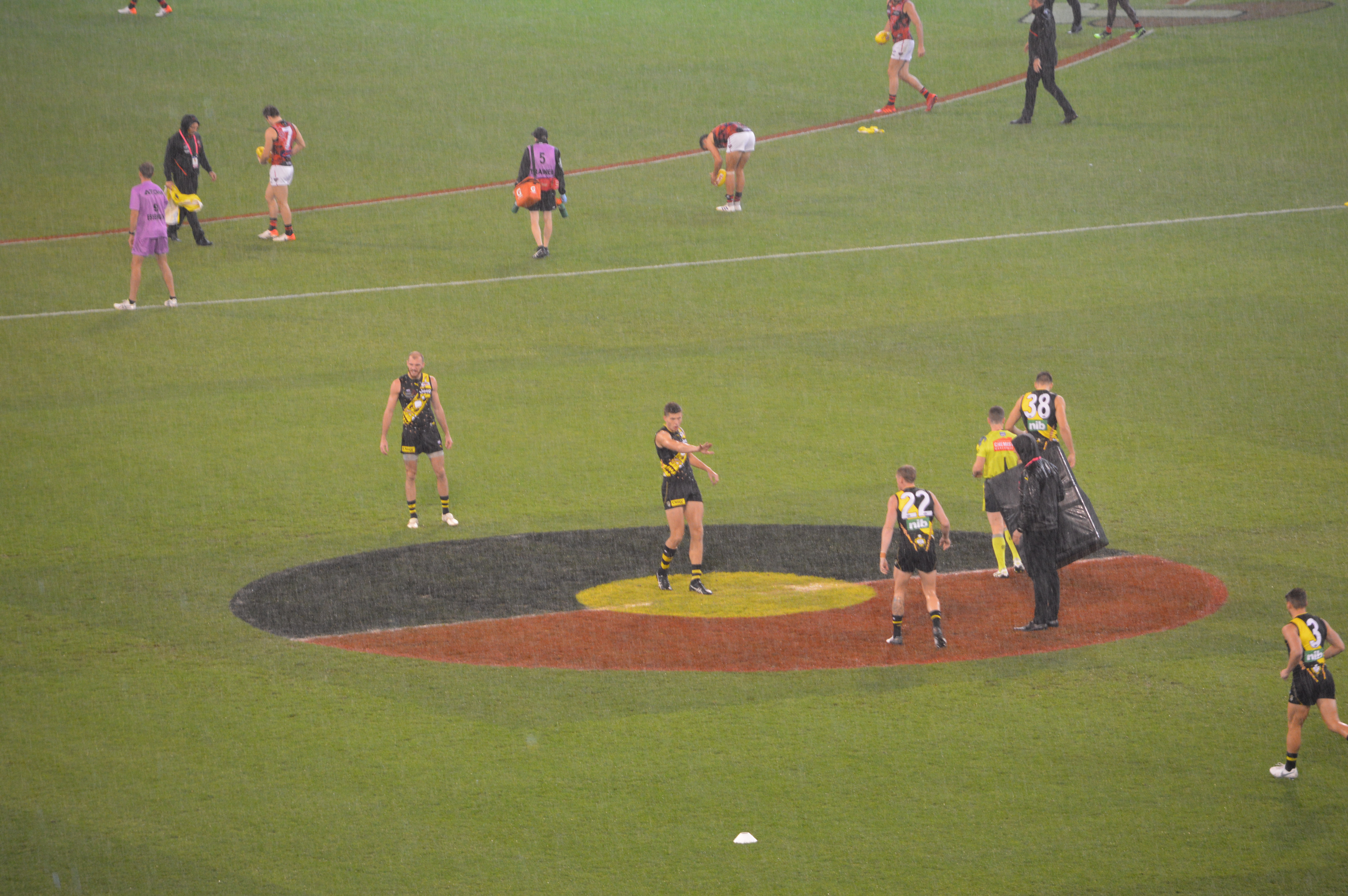
The centre circle is decorated with the colours of the Aboriginal flag in 2019

Since the first Indigenous Round in 2007, it has been customary for each pre-match ceremony to include a Welcome to Country, and performances by local Indigenous groups. Regular painted ground markings, sometimes including advertisements, are replaced with Indigenous symbols and flags throughout the round.

In 2017, to commemorate the 50th anniversary of the 1967 Australian Aboriginal referendum, ten indigenous players changed their guernsey numbers to either 50 or 67 during the Sir Doug Nicholls Round. The 67s were worn by Lance Franklin, Cedric Cox, Daniel Wells, Steven May, Zac Williams, Shaun Burgoyne and Shane Edwards.

An AFLW Indigenous Round Honouree is announced for each season. To date these are as follows:

- 2021: Joy Murphy Wandin AO
- 2022 (Season 6): Alicia Janz
- 2022 (Season 7): Pam Pederson ("Aunty Pam"), a Yorta Yorta woman, the youngest daughter of Sir Doug and Lady Gladys Nicholls
- 2023: Ebony Abbott-McCormack, Northern Territory footballer and advocate
- 2024: Mary Dunn

== See also ==
- Indigenous All-Stars (Australian rules football)
