= Ahir Shah =

British comedian

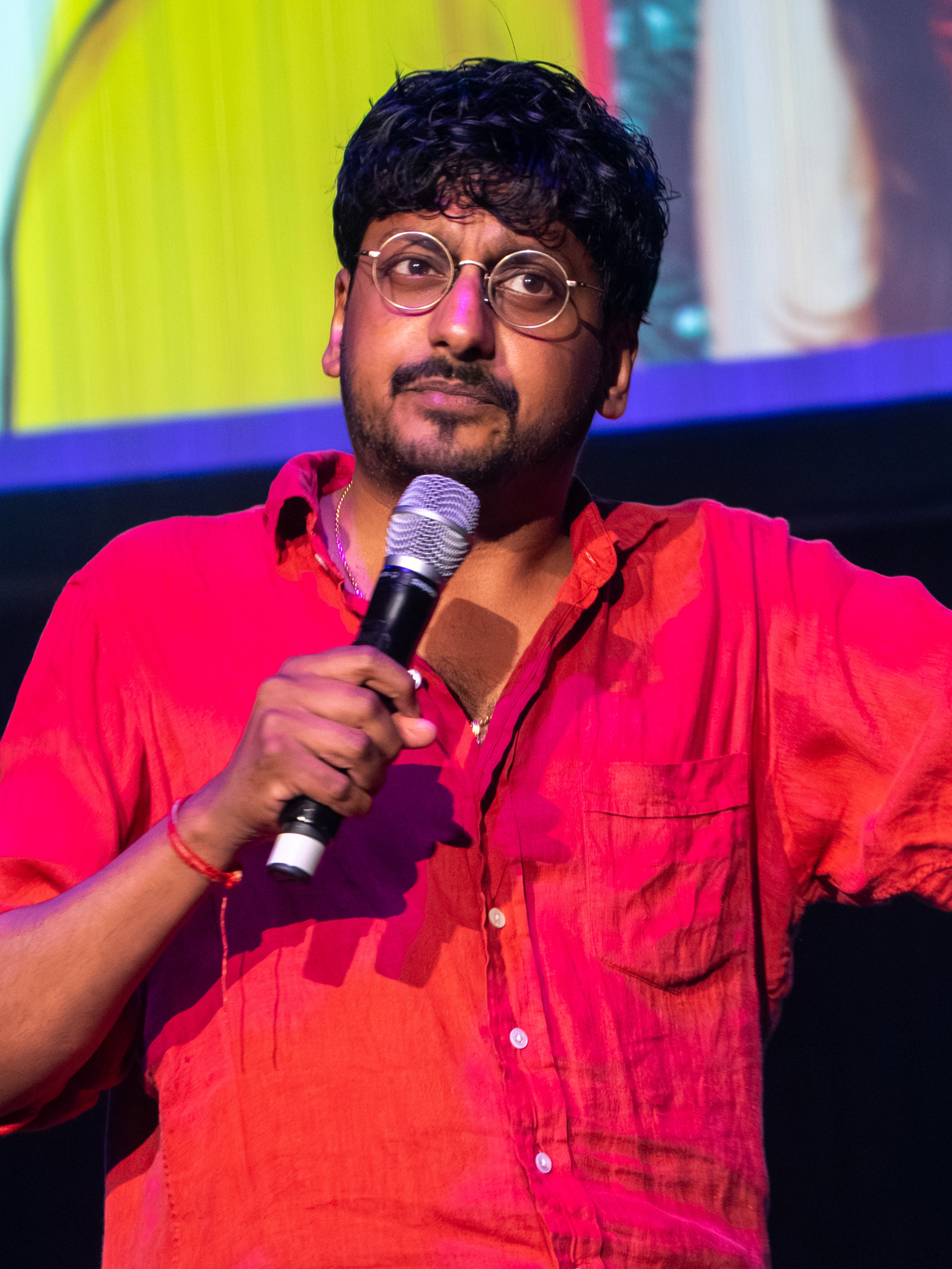
- Shah at the 2025 Edinburgh Festival Fringe
- Born: 28 December 1990 (age 35); London, England, UK
- Education: Clare College, Cambridge (BA)

Comedy career
- Years active: 2011–present
- Medium: Stand-up
- Genre: Political comedy
- Website: Official website

Ahir Shah (born 28 December 1990) is a British comedian. He was nominated for the Edinburgh Comedy Award at the Edinburgh Festival Fringe in 2017 and 2018, and won the award in 2023. Before that he was a finalist in the 2008 So You Think You're Funny? competition for new acts. Shah has been called "one of his generation's most eloquent comic voices".

== Early life ==
Shah was born and raised in London. His parents, Vikram and Alka, are originally from India. Shah's mother is a state primary school teacher. His grandmother, who had been living with the family in the UK, was deported to India when Shah was five years old because she had living family in her home country who were legally deemed to have the "money and the space" to support her.

He attended Preston Manor comprehensive school in Wembley and went on to the University of Cambridge. He graduated in 2012 with a degree in Politics, Psychology and Sociology (PPS) from Clare College.

== Career ==
When he was 15, Shah started doing comedy at open mic nights. His father had encouraged him to try different extracurricular activities, and stand-up comedy "struck a passion". He performed all through his school and university years, taking his debut show Astrology to Edinburgh in 2011.

In 2019, he toured the UK with his show Dots. His previous shows are Astrology (2011), Anatomy (2013), Texture (2014), Distant (2015), Machines (2016), Control (2017), and Duffer (2018).

Shah is a writer and performer on BBC Two's satirical news show The Mash Report. He has appeared on TV panel shows including Frankie Boyle's New World Order, Have I Got News For You, Mock the Week, House of Games, QI, Pointless, and The Last Leg, BBC Radio 4's The News Quiz, and has performed on Live at The Apollo. His acting credits include roles in Campus, Brotherhood, and Catastrophe.

In December 2019, it was announced that Shah would be joining fellow comedian Suzi Ruffell on her new radio panel show entitled Explicable Me on BBC Radio 2. In 2021, Shah had an HBO special called Dots.

In 2023, Shah won the Best Comedy Show award at the Edinburgh Festival Fringe for his show Ends. The show was available as a Netflix special from September 2024.

In 2024, he appeared as a co-host of The Bugle podcast.

In 2025, he made a BBC Radio 4 series, Ahir Shah's 7 Blunders of the World, based on the Seven Social Sins.

== Personal life ==
Shah has suffered from depression, and has discussed coming off medication for it during his stand-up routine.

He has spoken about his reluctance to be a "nodding dog" (an unthinking advocate) for white guilt in relation to European colonialism.

During the November 2015 Paris attacks, Shah was performing at Le Paname Art Café in the Rue de la Fontaine-au-Roi, only a few doors down from the Café Bonne Biere that was one of the attack sites. The experience formed part of Shah's 2016 show Machines.

== Edinburgh Fringe shows ==
Year	Title	Award/nomination	Notes
2008	Ahir Shah And Alex Maple: One Boy, One Man, Two Comedians		
2011	Ahir Shah: Astrology		
2013	Ahir Shah: Anatomy		
2014	Ahir Shah: Texture		
2015	Ahir Shah: Distant		
2016	Ahir Shah: Machines		
2017	Ahir Shah: Control	nominated for Edinburgh Comedy Award	
2018	Ahir Shah: Duffer	nominated for Edinburgh Comedy Award	
2019	Ahir Shah: Dots		
2021	Ahir Shah: Work-In-Progress		
2023	Ahir Shah: Ends	won Edinburgh Comedy Award	
2024	Ahir Shah: Ends		
2025	Ahir Shah: Work in Progress		
2026	Ahir Shah: Golden		
