= Seven deadly sins =

Set of vices in Christian theology

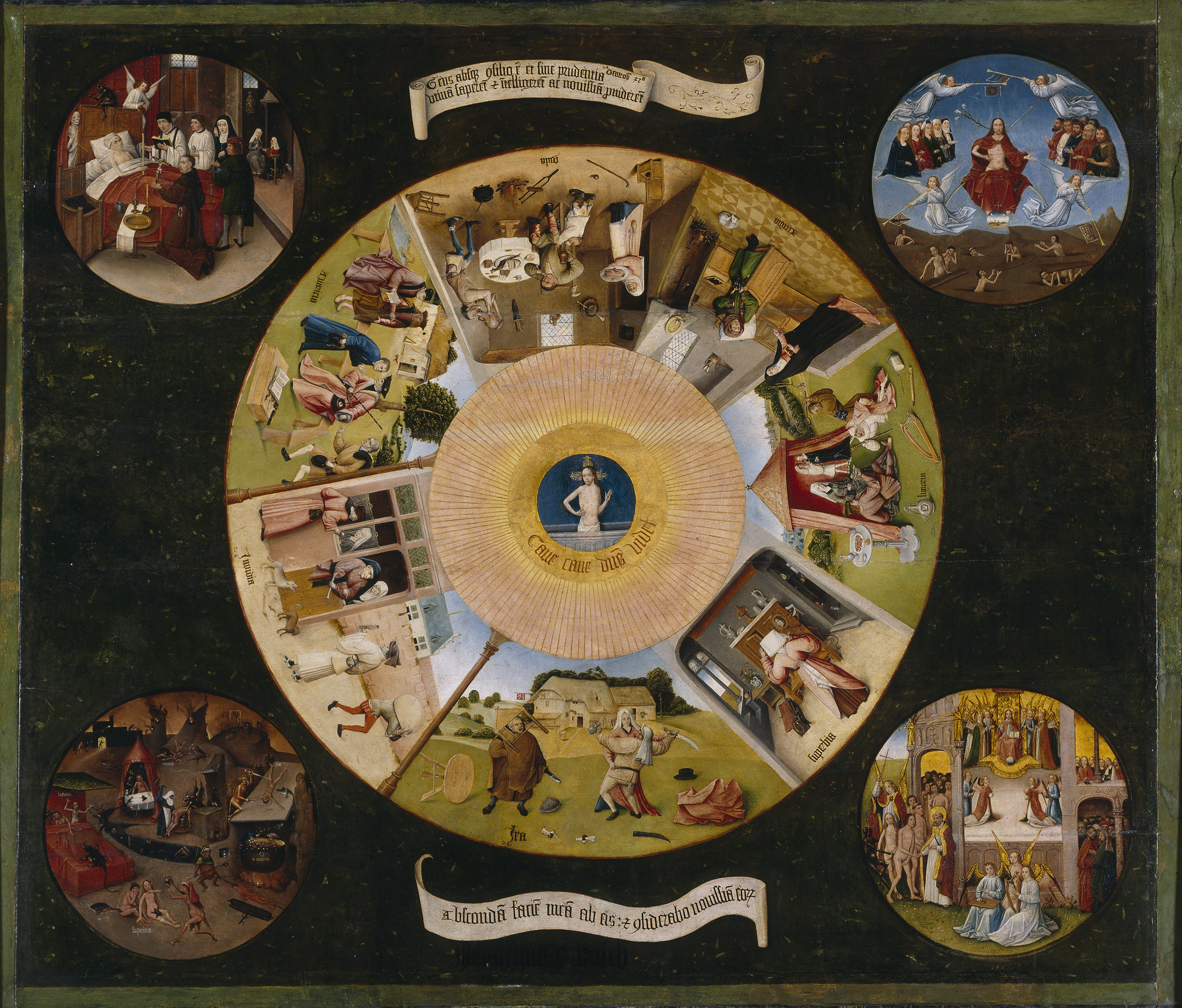
Hieronymus Bosch's The Seven Deadly Sins and the Four Last Things

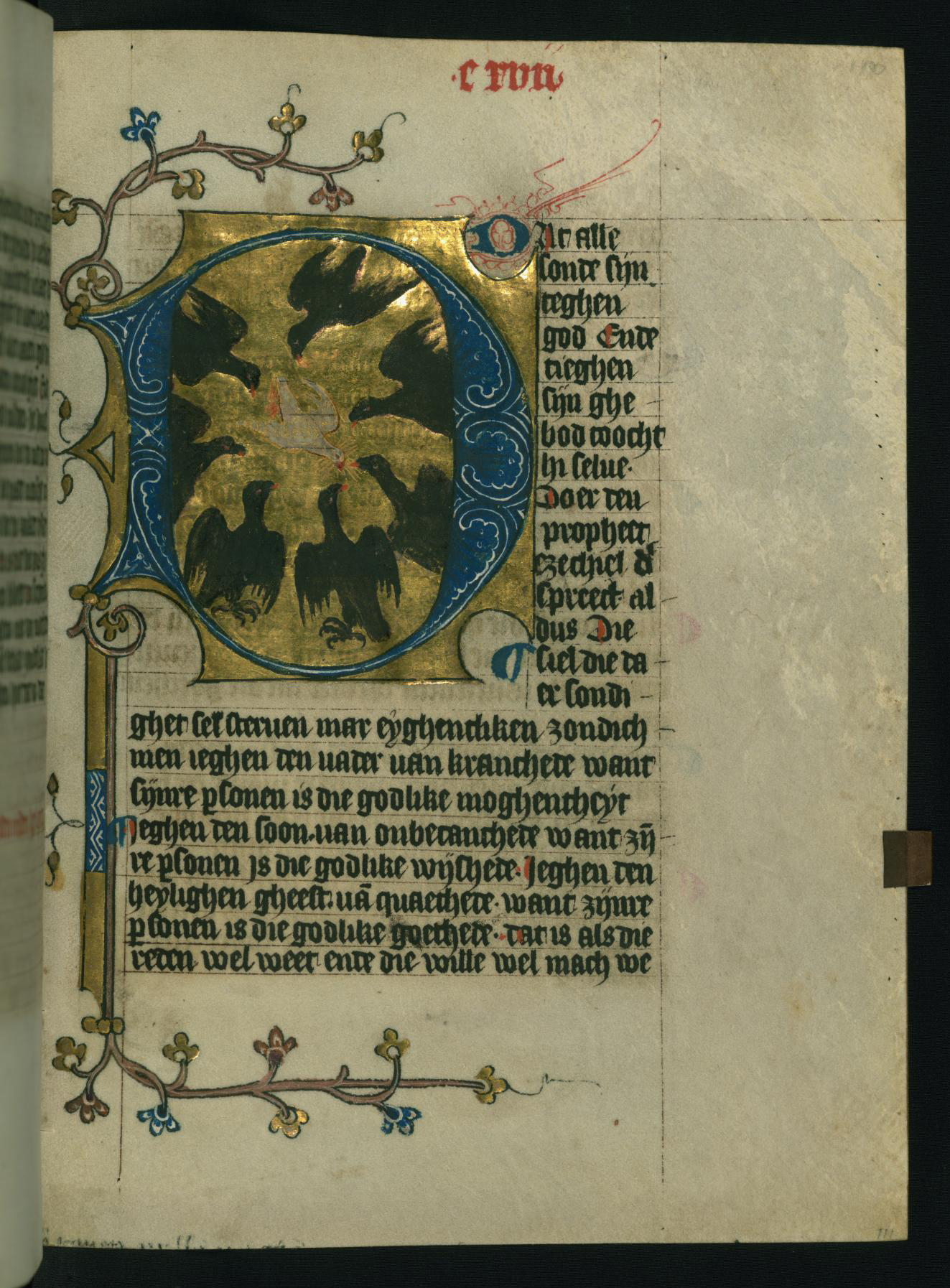
The Holy Spirit and the Seven Deadly Sins. Folio from Walters manuscript W.171 (15th century)

The seven deadly sins (also known as the capital vices or cardinal sins) function as a grouping of major vices within the teachings of Christianity. They are not explicitly listed in the Bible but developed within early Christian theological tradition, drawing on various biblical passages. In the standard list, the seven deadly sins according to the Catholic Church are wrath, greed, pride, envy, sloth, lust, and gluttony.

In Catholicism, the classification of deadly sins into a group of seven originated with Tertullian and continued with Evagrius Ponticus. The concepts were partly based on Greco-Roman and Biblical antecedents. Later, the concept of seven deadly sins evolved further, as shown by historical context based on the Latin language of the Roman Catholic Church, though with significant influence from the Greek language and associated religious traditions. Knowledge of this concept is evident in various treatises; in paintings and sculpture (for example, architectural decorations on churches in some Catholic parishes); and in some older textbooks. Further knowledge has been derived from patterns of confession.

During later centuries and in modern times, the idea of sins (especially seven in number) has influenced or inspired various streams of religious and philosophical thought, fine art painting, and modern popular media such as literature, film, and television.

== History ==
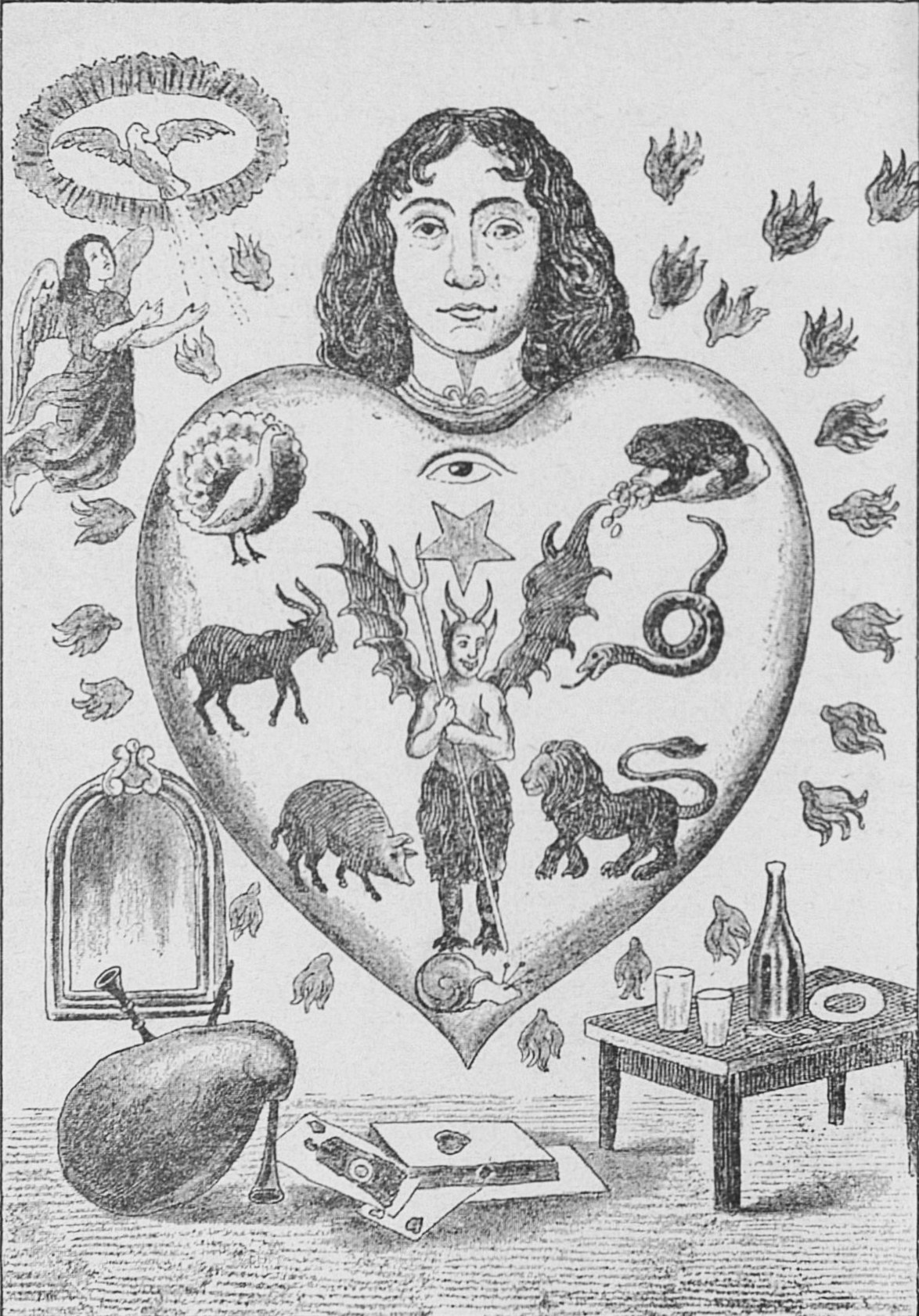
An allegorical image depicting the human heart subject to the seven deadly sins, each represented by an animal (clockwise: toad = avarice; snake = envy; lion = wrath; snail = sloth; pig = gluttony; goat = lust; peacock = pride)

With reference to the seven deadly sins, "evil thoughts" can be categorized as follows:

- physical (thoughts produced by the nutritive, sexual, and acquisitive appetites)
- emotional (thoughts produced by depressive, irascible, or dismissive moods)
- mental (thoughts produced by jealous, boastful, or hubristic states of mind)

The fourth-century monk Evagrius Ponticus reduced the logismoi (or forms of temptation) from nine to eight in number, as follows:

1. Γαστριμαργία (gastrimargia) gluttony
2. Πορνεία (porneia) prostitution, fornication
3. Φιλαργυρία (philargyria) greed
4. Λύπη (lypē) sadness, rendered in the Philokalia as envy, sadness at another's good fortune
5. Ὀργή (orgē) wrath
6. Ἀκηδία (akēdia) acedia (apathy, neglect, or indifference), rendered in the Philokalia as dejection
7. Κενοδοξία (kenodoxia) boasting
8. Ὑπερηφανία (hyperēphania) pride, sometimes rendered as self-overestimation, arrogance, or grandiosity

Evagrius's list was translated into their Latin equivalents in the genitive singular in many writings of John Cassian, one of Evagrius’s students; the list thus became part of the Western tradition's spiritual pietas or Catholic devotions as follows:

1. Gula (gluttony)
2. Fornicatio (lust, fornication)
3. Avaritia (greed, avarice)
4. Tristitia (sorrow, despair, despondency)
5. Ira (wrath)
6. Acedia (sloth)
7. Vanagloria (vanity, vainglory)
8. Superbia (pride)

In AD 590, Pope Gregory I revised this list into the form that has become common. He removed superbia as it is the "queen of all vices" leading other seven captains; removed acedia, but he taught that among the sins it produces, tristitia is the root of a certain slothfulness (“torpor”) about fulfilling the moral precepts (“torpor circa praecepta”); added envy, which is invidia in Latin; replaced fornicatio with luxuria. (Pope Gregory's list corresponds to the traits described in Pirkei Avot as "removing one from the world.") Thomas Aquinas uses and defends Gregory's list in his Summa Theologica, although he calls them the "capital sins", because they are the head and form of all the other sins. He added acedia and removed tristitia. St. Robert Bellarmine in his catechism, "Doctrina Christiana Catechismus, seu Explicatio Fidei Christianae", combines vainglory with pride and this is where we get modern list. Christian denominations, such as the Anglican Communion, Lutheran Church, and Methodist Church, still retain this list; modern evangelists such as Billy Graham have explicated it.

== Definitions and perspectives ==
According to Henry Edward Manning, a Catholic prelate, the seven deadly sins are seven ways to eternal death (or Hell). The Lutheran divine Martin Chemnitz, who contributed to the development of Lutheran systematic theology, implored clergy to remind faithful congregations about the seven deadly sins.

In order of increasing severity according to Pope Gregory I, the seven deadly sins are as follows:

=== Lust ===
Lust or lechery is intense longing. It is usually viewed as intense or unbridled sexual desire, which may lead to adultery, rape, bestiality or other sinful and sexual acts. Lust can also denote other forms of unbridled desire, such as for money or power. Henry Edward Manning explains that the impurity of lust transforms one into "a slave of the devil".

Lust is generally thought to be the mildest capital sin. Thomas Aquinas considers it an abuse of a faculty that humans share with animals, and sins of the flesh are less grievous than spiritual sins.

=== Gluttony ===
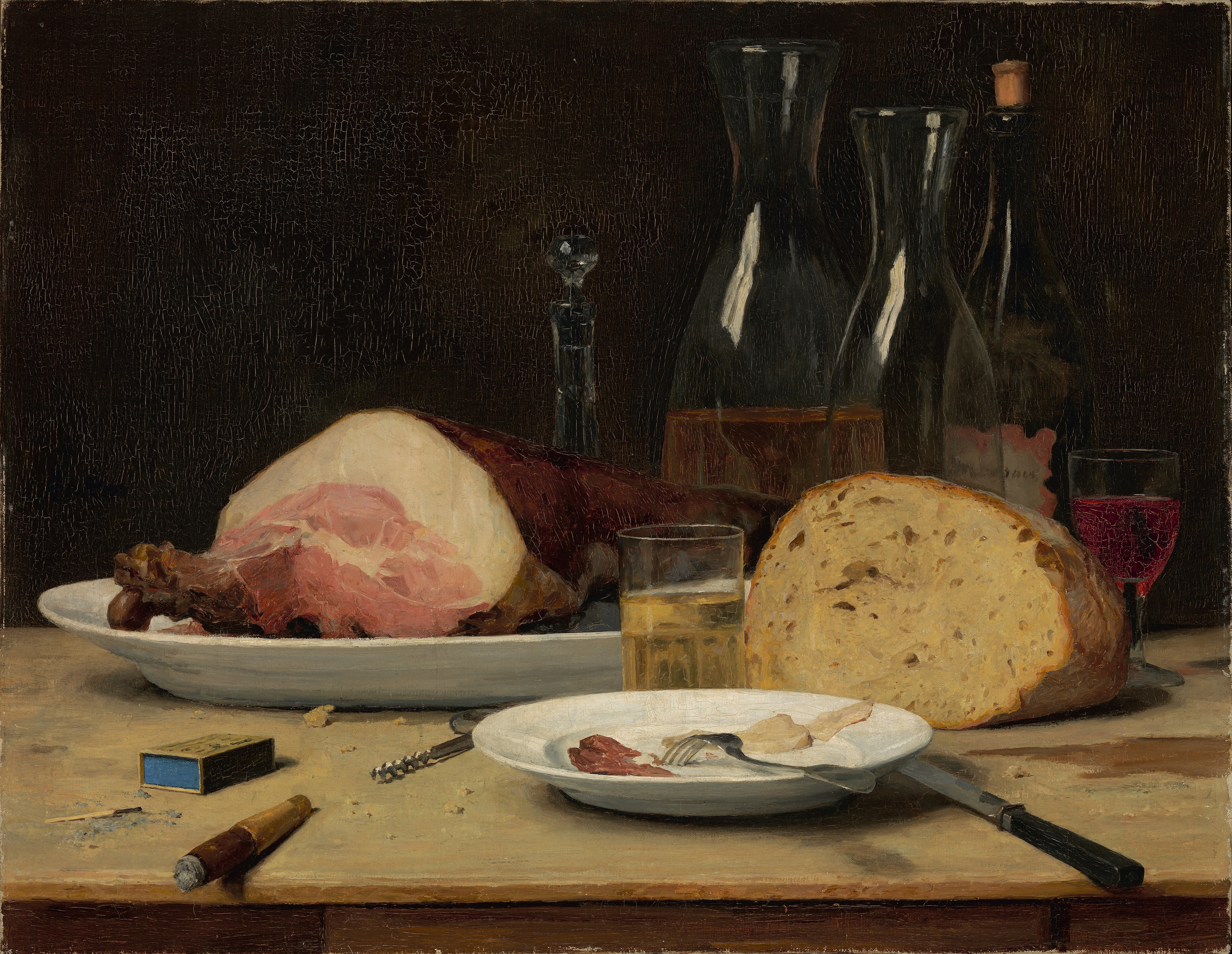
Still life: Excess (Albert Anker, 1896)

Gluttony is the overindulgence and overconsumption of anything to the point of excess. The word derives from the Latin gluttire, meaning 'to gulp down' or 'to swallow'. One reason for condemning gluttony is that gorging by prosperous people may leave needy people hungry.

Medieval theologians such as Thomas Aquinas took a more expansive view of gluttony, arguing that it could also include an obsessive anticipation of meals, as well as overindulgence in delicacies and costly foods. Aquinas listed five forms of gluttony:

- Laute – eating too expensively
- Studiose – eating too daintily
- Nimis – eating too much
- Praepropere – eating too soon
- Ardenter – eating too eagerly

=== Greed ===
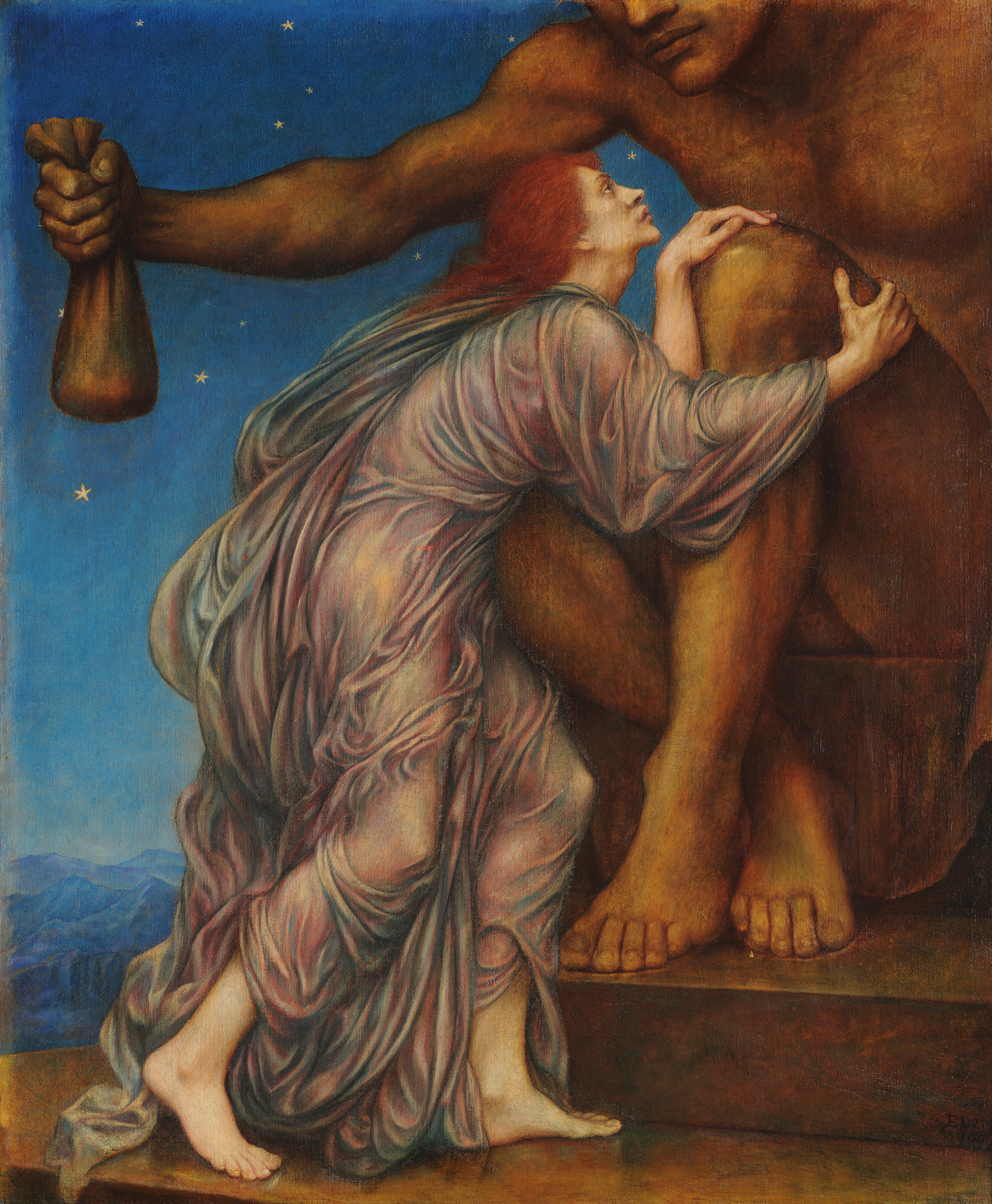
The Worship of Mammon (1909) by Evelyn De Morgan

In the words of Henry Edward Manning, avarice "plunges a man deep into the mire of this world, so that he makes it to be his god".

Greed, or avarice as it came to be known, has many forms. When Pope Gregory I revised the sins, he defined greed as "treachery, fraud, deceit, perjury, restlessness, violence and hardnesses of heart against compassion." This definition would evolve into the modern interpretation: outside Christian writings, greed is an inordinate desire to acquire or possess more than one needs, especially with respect to material wealth. Aquinas believed that greed, like pride, can lead to evil.

=== Sloth ===
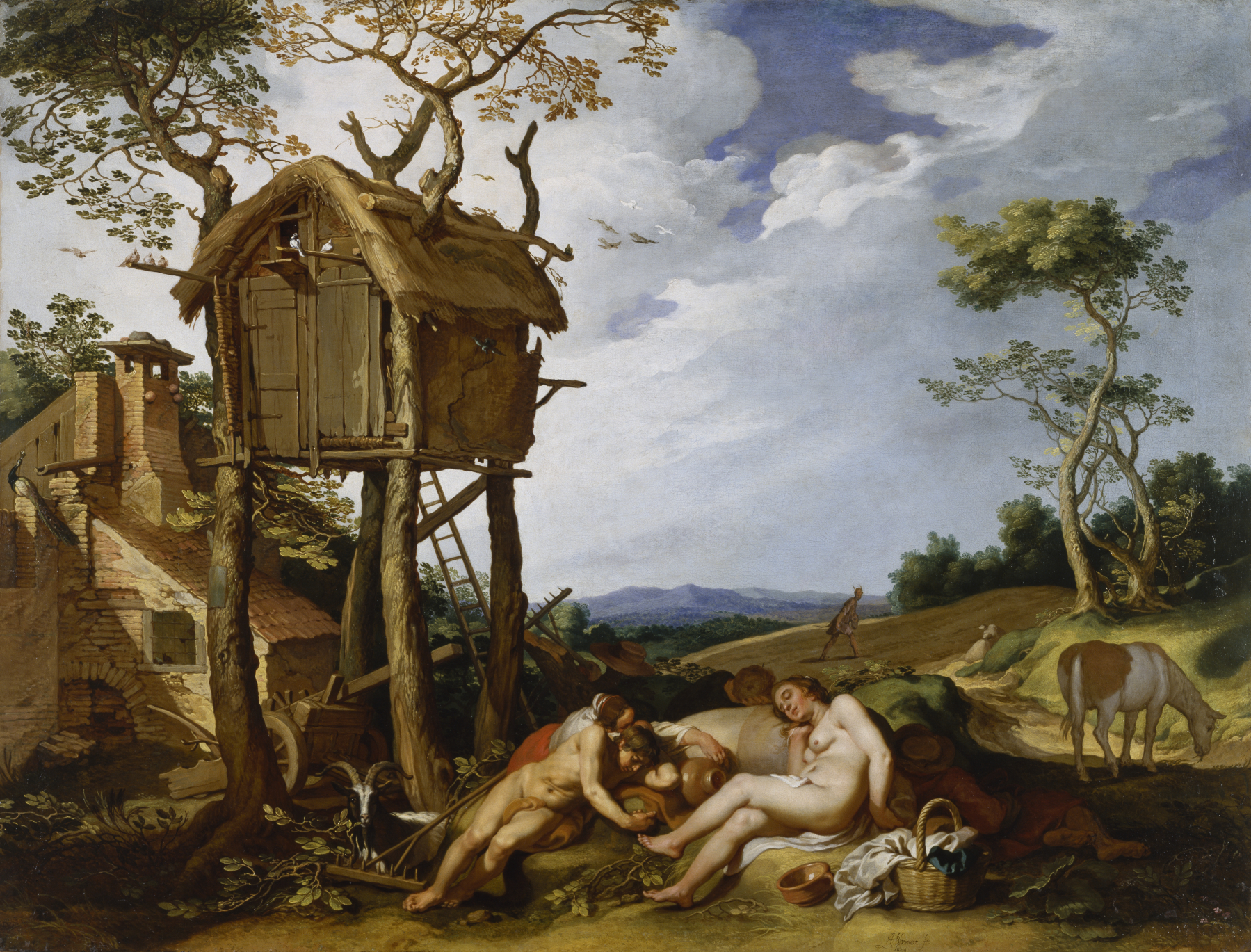
Parable of the Wheat and the Tares (1624) by Abraham Bloemaert, Walters Art Museum

Sloth refers to many related ideas, dating from antiquity, and includes spiritual, mental, and physical states. The definition has changed considerably since it was first recognized as a sin. Today it can be defined as the absence of interest in or habitual disinclination to exertion. Originally, however, Christian theologians believed it to be a lack of care for performing spiritual duties.

In his Summa Theologica, Saint Thomas Aquinas defined sloth as "sorrow about spiritual good".

The scope of sloth is wide. In a spiritual sense, acedia first referred to an affliction attending religious persons, especially monks, wherein they became indifferent to their duties and obligations to God. In a mental sense, acedia has a number of distinctive components: the most important of these is affectlessness—a lack of any feeling about self or other; a mind-state that gives rise to boredom, rancor, apathy; and a passive inert or sluggish mentation. In a physical sense, acedia is fundamentally associated with a cessation of motion and an indifference to work; the sin finds expression in laziness, idleness, and indolence.

Sloth includes ceasing to use the seven gifts of grace given by the Holy Spirit; these gifts are Wisdom, Understanding, Counsel, Knowledge, Piety, Fortitude, and Fear of the Lord. Such disregard may lead to slower spiritual progress towards eternal life, neglect of multiple duties of charity towards a neighbor, and animosity towards those who love God.

The other deadly sins are sins of committing immorality; by contrast, sloth is a sin of avoiding responsibilities. The sin may arise from any of the other capital vices: for example, a son may avoid his duty to his father because of anger. The state and habit of sloth is a mortal sin; but the habit of the soul tending towards the last mortal state of sloth is not mortal in and of itself, except under certain circumstances.

Emotionally, and cognitively, the evil of acedia (or sloth) finds expression in a lack of feeling for the world, the people in it, or the self. Acedia takes form as an alienation of the sentient self first from the world and then from itself. The most profound versions of this condition are found in a withdrawal from all forms of participation in, or care for, others or oneself. Nevertheless, a lesser yet more harmful element was also noted by theologians: Gregory the Great asserted that, "from tristitia, there arise malice, rancour, cowardice, [and] despair".

Chaucer also dealt with this attribute of acedia, reckoning the characteristics of the sin to include despair, somnolence, idleness, tardiness, negligence, laziness, and wrawnesse, the last variously translated as 'anger' or better as 'peevishness'. For Chaucer, human sin consists in languishing and holding back, refusing to undertake works of goodness because (people tell themselves) the circumstances surrounding the establishment of good are too grievous and too difficult to suffer. Acedia in Chaucer's view is thus the enemy of every source and motive for work.

According to Stanford Lyman, sloth subverts the maintenance of the body, taking no care for its daily needs; sloth also slows down the mind, diverting its attention away from important matters. Sloth hinders a person in moral undertakings, and it thus becomes a significant source of a person's ruin.

=== Wrath ===
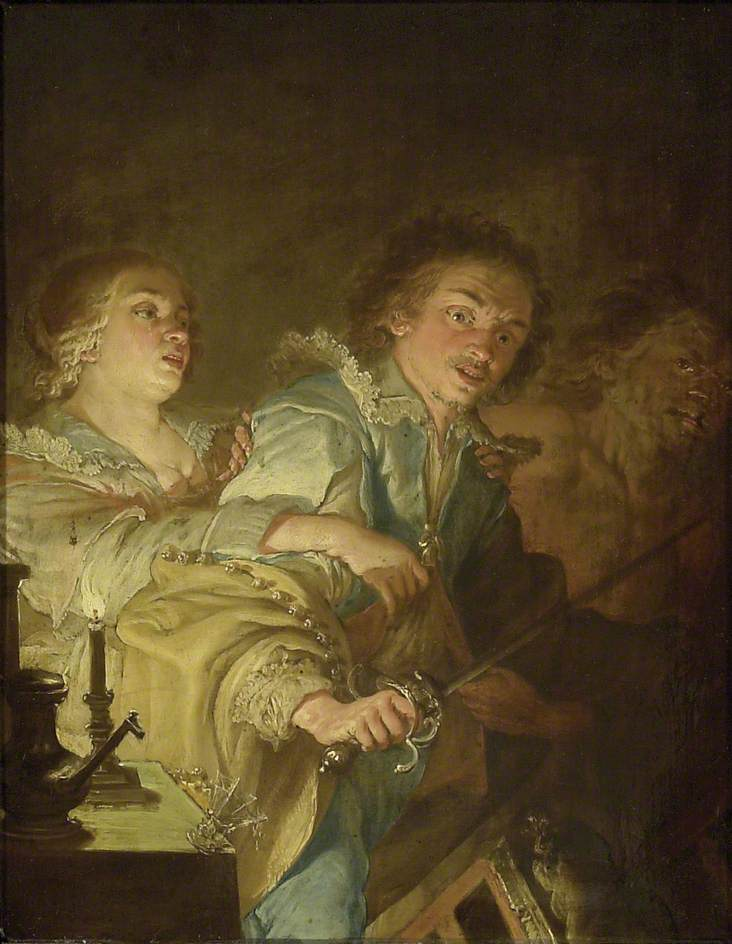
Wrath, by Jacques de l'Ange

Wrath can be defined as uncontrolled feelings of anger, rage, and even hatred. Wrath often reveals itself in the wish to seek vengeance.

According to the Catechism of the Catholic Church, the neutral act of anger becomes the sin of wrath when it is directed against an innocent person; when it is unduly strong or long-lasting; or when it desires excessive punishment. "If anger reaches the point of a deliberate desire to kill or seriously wound a neighbor, it is gravely against charity; it is a mortal sin". Hatred is the sin of desiring that someone else may suffer misfortune or evil, and it is a mortal sin when one desires grave harm.

People feel angry when they sense that they or someone they care about has been offended; when they are certain about the nature and cause of the angering event; when they are certain someone else is responsible; and when they feel that they can still influence the situation or cope with it.

Henry Edward Manning considers that "angry people are slaves to themselves".

=== Envy ===
Envy is characterized by an insatiable desire such as greed and lust. It can be described as a sad or resentful covetousness towards the traits or possessions of another person. Envy stems from vainglory and cuts a person off from their neighbor.

According to St. Thomas Aquinas, the struggle aroused by envy has three stages:

1. During the first stage, the envious person attempts to lower another person's reputation
2. In the middle stage, the envious person receives either "joy at another's misfortune" (if he succeeds in defaming the other person) or "grief at another's prosperity" (if he fails)
3. the third stage is hatred because "sorrow causes hatred"

Bertrand Russell said that envy was one of the most potent causes of unhappiness, bringing sorrow to committers of envy, while giving them the urge to inflict pain upon others.

=== Pride ===
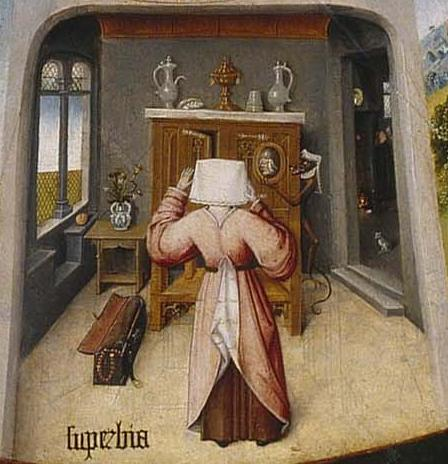
Detail of Pride from The Seven Deadly Sins and the Four Last Things by Hieronymus Bosch, c. 1500

Pride is known as hubris (from the Ancient Greek ὕβρις) or futility; it is considered the original and worst of the seven deadly sins—the most demonic—on almost every list. Pride is also thought to be the source of the other capital sins. Pride is viewed as the opposite of humility.

C. S. Lewis writes in Mere Christianity that pride is the "anti-God" state, the position in which the ego and the self are directly opposed to God: "Unchastity, anger, greed, drunkenness and all that, are mere fleabites in comparison: it was through Pride that Lucifer became wicked: Pride leads to every other vice: it is the complete anti-God state of mind." Pride is understood to sever the human spirit from God, as well as from the life and grace given by God's presence.

A person can be prideful for different reasons. Author Ichabod Spencer states that "spiritual pride is the worst kind of pride, if not worst snare of the devil. The heart is particularly deceitful on this one thing." Jonathan Edwards wrote: "remember that pride is the worst viper that is in the heart, the greatest disturber of the soul's peace and sweet communion with Christ; it was the first sin that ever was and lies lowest in the foundation of Lucifer's whole building and is the most difficultly rooted out and is the most hidden, secret and deceitful of all lusts and often creeps in, insensibly, into the midst of religion and sometimes under the disguise of humility."

Modern use of the term pride may be captured in the biblical proverb, "Pride goeth before destruction, a haughty spirit before a fall" (which is abbreviated as "Pride goeth before a fall" in Proverbs 16:18). The "pride that blinds" causes foolish actions against common sense. In political analysis, hubris is often used to describe how powerful leaders become irrationally self-confident and contemptuous of advice over time, leading them to act impulsively.

== Historical sins ==
=== Acedia ===
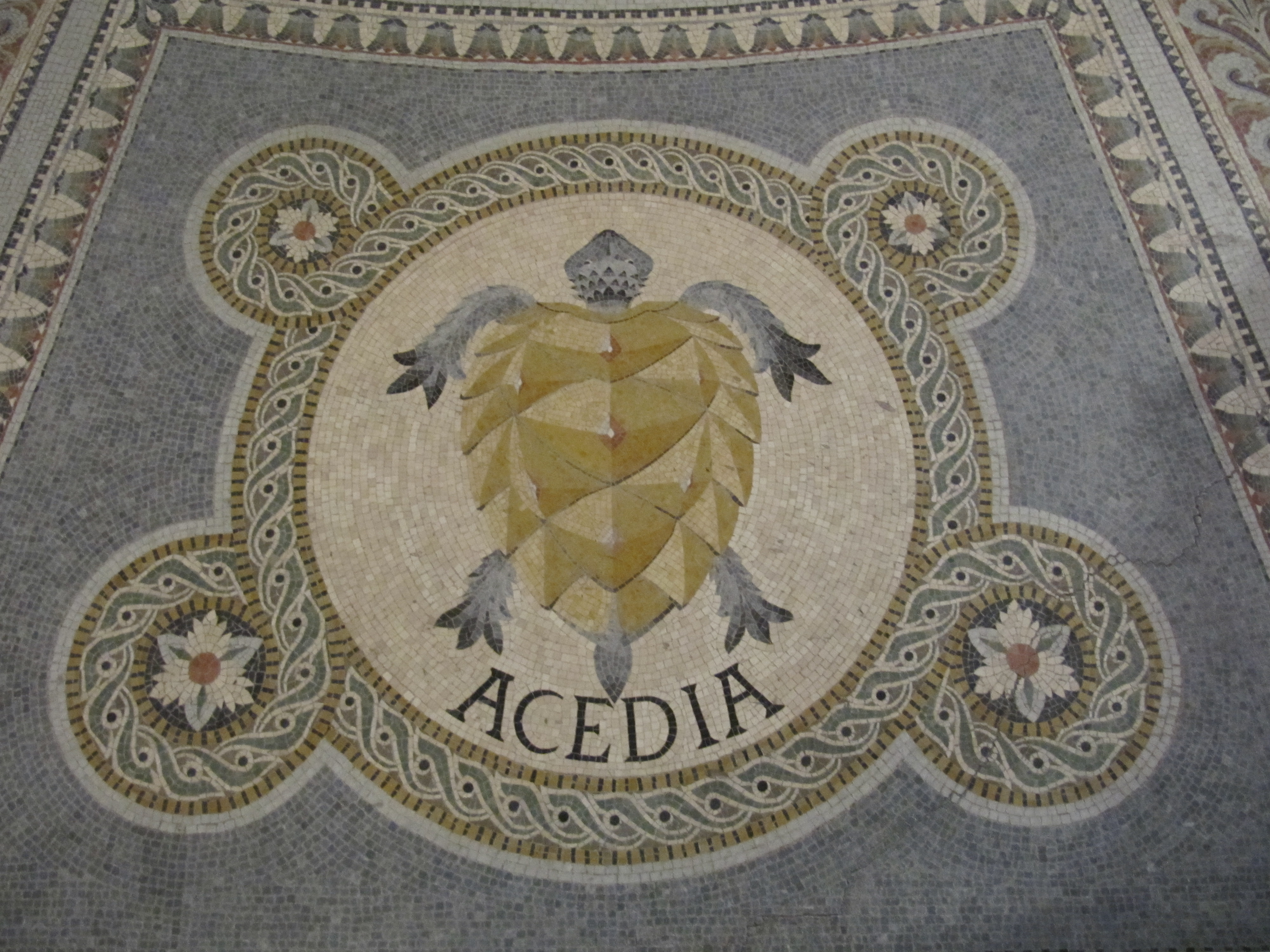
Acedia mosaic, Basilica of Notre-Dame de Fourvière

Acedia is neglecting to take care of something that one should do. The term can be translated as 'apathetic listlessness' or depression. It is related to melancholy; acedia describes the behaviour, and melancholy suggests the emotion producing it. In early Christian thought, the lack of joy was regarded as a willful refusal to enjoy the goodness of God. By contrast, apathy was considered a refusal to help others in times of need.

Acēdia is the negative form of the Greek term κηδεία (kēdeia), which has a more restricted usage. Kēdeia refers specifically to spousal love and respect for the dead.

Pope Gregory combined acedia with tristitia to form sloth in his list. When Thomas Aquinas considered acedia in his interpretation of this list, he described it as an "uneasiness of the mind", which was a progenitor for lesser sins such as restlessness and instability.

Acedia is currently defined in the Catechism of the Catholic Church as spiritual sloth—believing spiritual tasks to be too difficult. In the fourth century, Christian monks believed that acedia was primarily caused by a state of melancholia that caused spiritual detachment rather than laziness.

=== Vainglory ===
Vainglory is unjustified boasting. Pope Gregory viewed it as a form of pride, so he merged vainglory into pride in his list of sins. Vainglory is the progenitor of envy.

Professor Kevin M. Clarke observes that vainglory is technically different from pride: vainglory is "when we seek human acclaim", while pride is "taking spiritual credit for what I've done, instead of ascribing one's good deeds to God".

The Latin term gloria roughly means 'boasting', although its English cognate glory has come to have an exclusively positive meaning. Historically, the term vain meant roughly 'futile' (a meaning retained in the modern expression in vain); but by the fourteenth century, vain had come to have the strong narcissistic undertones that it retains today.

== Patterns of confession ==
According to a 2009 study by the Jesuit scholar Fr. Roberto Busa, the most common deadly sin confessed by men is lust, and the most common deadly sin confessed by women is pride. It is unclear whether these differences were due to the actual number of transgressions committed by each sex, or whether the observed pattern was caused by differing views on what matters or should be confessed.

== See also ==
- Arishadvargas in Hinduism
- Cardinal virtues – Virtues of mind and character
- Chivalry – Traditional ideology and code of conduct of knights
- Christian ethics – Branch of theology that defines virtuous and sinful behavior from a Christian perspective
- Dante's seven deadly vices
- Eight Dusts in Tenrikyo
- Enneagram of Personality – Model of the human psyche used as a personality typology
- Eternal sin – Sin which will never be forgiven by God
- Five poisons in Buddhism
- Five thieves in Sikhism
- Nafs and Tazkiah in Islam
- Prajnaparamita – Principle in Buddhism and the texts associated with it
- Seven Social Sins – Mohandas Gandhi's list of negative qualities
- Seven virtues
- Ten Commandments – Biblical principles relating to ethics and worship
- The Fable of The Bees: or, Private Vices, Public Benefits – 1714 book by Bernard Mandeville
- The Seven Deadly Sins of Modern Times – 1993 painting by Susan Dorothea White
- The Seven Sins of Memory – 2001 book by Daniel Schacter
- Theological virtues – Christian ethics
- Three poisons in Buddhism
- Tree of virtues and tree of vices – Diagrams of the relationship between virtues and vices in medieval Christianity
- Se7en – 1995 film by David Fincher
