= Angeles Arrien =

Basque-American cultural anthropologist

Angeles Arrien (December 25, 1940 – April 24, 2014) was a Basque-American cultural anthropologist, educator, author, lecturer and consultant, best known for her book The Four-Fold Way: Walking the Paths of the Warrior, Healer, Teacher and Visionary.

== Early life ==
Angeles Arrien was born in 1940 in the Basque Country, Spain, to Salvatore Arrien and Marie Elordi. She moved with her family to Idaho, USA, when she was seven years old, and later became a naturalized American. She received a Bachelor's degree from the University of Idaho, a Master's degree in Anthropology and Folklore from the University of California Berkeley, and a doctorate in Anthropology (focused on cultural anthropology and comparative religions) from the California Institute of Integral Studies.

== Career ==
Arrien taught at the California Institute of Integral Studies, the Alaya Institute, Spain, John F. Kennedy University, and at the Metta Institute, California. She was a founder of the External (Global) Program at the Institute of Transpersonal Psychology (now Sofia University). She served as Vice President of the Association for Transpersonal Psychology and as President of the Angeles Arrien Foundation for Cross-Cultural Education and Research. She received honorary doctorates from the Institute of Transpersonal Psychology and the East-West Interfaith Ministry, California. She lectured, gave keynote speeches to medical, academic and corporate conferences, held workshops and worked as a personal consultant across the US and worldwide. She mentored many colleagues, students and individuals.

Arrien published ten major works that bridged anthropology, psychology, and religion over a period of twenty-four years, and which were translated into many languages. Her book The Signs of Life won the 1993 IBPA Benjamin Franklin Award, and The Second Half of Life won the 2007 Nautilus Book Award for Best book on Ageing. Her book Working Together, in which she recognised that cultural diversity is a reality in many fields of employment, and proposed strategies that would enable workforces to build on that diversity and create bridges between people from different cultural backgrounds, was influential in the fields of leadership development and change management. The concepts developed in her book The Four-Fold Way: Walking the Paths of the Warrior, Healer, Teacher and Visionary influenced the personal and professional development of many who attended her lectures, keynote speeches or workshops.

Arrien died on April 24, 2014, aged 74, due to pneumonia.

== Bibliography ==
- The Tarot handbook : practical applications of ancient visual symbols (1987, 1991, 1997)
- Power and Love in Relationships (1991)
- Signs of life : the five universal shapes and how to use them (1992, 1998)
- The Four-Fold Way: walking the paths of the warrior, teacher, healer, and visionary (1993, 2013)
- Gathering Medicine: stories, songs, and methods for soul retrieval (1994)
- Working Together: producing synergy by honoring diversity (editor; 1998, 2001)
- The Nine Muses: a mythological path to creativity (2000)
- The Preferential Shapes Test (2002)
- The Second Half of Life: opening the eight gates of wisdom (2007)
- Living in Gratitude: a journey that will change your life (2011)
