= Frank Ostaseski =

American Buddhist teacher

Frank Ostaseski is an American Buddhist teacher and a leader in the field of end-of-life care. He is the Guiding Teacher and founding director of the Zen Hospice Project in San Francisco. The AARP (American Association of Retired Persons) named him one of their "50 Most Innovative People Over 50" in 2003.

== Biography ==
Ostaseski is a former spiritual teacher-in-residence at the Esalen Institute. In 1987, he co-founded the Zen Hospice Project, the first Buddhist hospice in the United States, and created the Metta Institute to train professionals in providing mindful and compassionate end-of-life care.

He conducts workshops that reveal people's attitude towards death and emphasizes a mindful approach to caring for the dying, such as "Spiritual Practices in Accompanying the Dying", "Forming a Compassionate Community", and "Being a Compassionate Caregiver".

== Publications ==
- Ostaseski, Frank (March 14, 2017). The Five Invitations: Discovering What Death Can Teach Us About Living Fully. Flatiron Books. ISBN 978-1-250-07465-2.
