= Susan Dorothea White =

Australian artist

Susan Dorothea White (born 10 August 1941) is an Australian artist and author. She is a narrative artist and her work concerns the natural world and human situation, increasingly incorporating satire and irony to convey her concern for human rights and equality. She is the author of Draw Like da Vinci (2006).

== Education and early career ==
Born in Adelaide, South Australia on 10 August 1941, White grew up in the outback mining town of Broken Hill. She started boarding school in Adelaide in 1954, returning home to Broken Hill during school vacations to paint and draw. White first exhibited in 1957; in 1958, while still at school in Adelaide, she began accepting commissions and attended Saturday drawing classes conducted by the artist James Cant, who together with his wife Dora Chapman, had settled permanently in Adelaide in 1956. From 1959 to mid-1960, White was a student in the Diploma of Fine Art program at the South Australian School of Art. At SASA, White was initiated in art appreciation by Dora Chapman who taught her "a broad range of skills including perspective projection". White also learnt lithography from Udo Sellbach. Adelaide art critic Elizabeth Young described White's work in the 1959 exhibition Painters and Sculptors of Promise, organised by the Royal South Australian Society of Arts, as "an able landscape impression".

White was a regular prize-winner in the annual Broken Hill exhibitions from 1959 to 1962. With other artists such as Florence May Harding, Pro Hart, and Sam Byrne (painter), White was a foundation member of the Willyama Art Society and participated in its Broken Hill and Adelaide exhibitions in 1961 and 1962. Her portrait of Mr. H.L.C. Cotton, father of the Australian senator Bob Cotton, was described as "strongly painted...outstanding".

In July 1960, White moved to Sydney to continue full-time studies at the Julian Ashton Art School under its principal teacher Henry Gibbons. She also attended evening classes at the National Art School, in sculpture under Lyndon Dadswell and in drawing. White held her first solo exhibition in 1962 at age 20 at the Technical College in Broken Hill; this exhibition comprised 60 works and included oil and watercolour paintings, drawings, lithographs, and etchings. Praising the quality of her work, Harding wrote: "Bowing to no popular ism or formula except hard work, practice and observation, Susan White turned to our countryside with the fresh vision and vigor of youth. In her pictures it is all there – the red clay, erosion, bramble wattles bursting in bloom, the 'little creeks', big gums, struggling roots, wispy foliage, dry white grass, the silver sheen of the saltbush, dark rocky outcrops... Miss White's exhibition...is a must for all Broken Hill art lovers". In 1963, Sydney critic Daniel Thomas described her landscape painting as "good in its curious Victorian way".

== Painting ==
White's earliest paintings are mostly oils on composition board and watercolours. In the 1970s she changed from oils to the use of acrylics on wood panel. She developed skill in a painting technique "that produces nuance in colour and subtle gradations in tones. The basis of the method is the application of successive washes of acrylic colour to the wood with light sanding of the surface between each wash." The New York critic Andrew Margolis described White's more recent paintings as exploring "the most intimate experiences of her life, as well as more topical subjects, in meticulously limned acrylic paintings on wood panels. Her ability to examine unflinchingly such personal milestones as her surgery for a benign brain tumor with a dazed self-portrait in a vertiginously askew hospital setting results in some of the most emotionally jarring narrative imagery in recent art". Some of White's acrylic paintings incorporate collage.

White's large tableau The First Supper, which was painted in 1988 at the time of the Australian Bicentenary, shows White's inventiveness and concern for human issues. Controversial in Australia, the painting was exhibited in her solo exhibition in Amsterdam where it featured in the Dutch art journal Kunstbeeld: "The work shows clearly Susan White's thinking about human rights. It should be mentioned here that she sometimes places her many faceted talent at the service of the struggle for human rights". Subsequently, The First Supper was exhibited in a solo show in Cologne, in the Munich Volkshochschule and in other centres in Germany with media commenting "...in this portrayal Jesus is a woman, an Australian aboriginal. Her 'female disciples' are sitting to her right and left: women from all corners of the world..." and "...the image generates intense discussion". An American doctoral dissertation and a 1999 journal article analyse The First Supper as "a subversive postmodern ironic reading of Leonardo da Vinci's The Last Supper".

White's 2012 painting The Anatomy Lesson of Dr Freeman references Rembrandt's The Anatomy Lesson of Dr. Nicolaes Tulp by setting it in a contemporary university laboratory with each of the onlookers rendered as an anatomical prosection and skeleton. The painting was first exhibited in a 'circuito off' curated group show Sapere Aude during the 55th Venice Biennale in 2013.

== Sculpture ==
White studied sculpture at the South Australian School of Art; subsequently she learned from Lyndon Dadswell at the National Art School in Sydney. She works in sandstone, marble, wood carving, bronze, and mixed-media assemblage. Her sculpture Companion for Brancusi's 'Young Man' (see External links) was carved from Queensland maple in response to the sculpture Torso of a Young Man by Constantin Brâncuși, also carved in maple.

White's mixed-media assemblages incorporate fabrics with the carving of rare Huon pine salvaged from Tasmania. Following her solo show in New York in 1998, the Hechinger Collection acquired White's mixed media assemblage It Cuts Both Ways, which was then displayed in a long-term exhibition at the National Building Museum.

White exhibited bronzes in Geneva (1997) and Nice (2000), and mixed media assemblages in the Florence Biennale in 2001 and in a curated fringe exhibition during the Venice Biennale in 2013. In 2005 the Buhl Collection (New York) commissioned a large bronze sculpture Stretching the Imagination. White won first prize in the inside section of HarbourSculpture 2017 (Sydney) with her work To Cut Both Ways, a sculpture of chrome-plated bronze and scissors, which explores the theme that one's actions can have an equal effect on another, similar to the sculpture It Cuts Both Ways (above).

== Printmaking and drawing ==
As a printmaker, White has produced etchings, lithographs, woodcuts, and linocuts since 1960. She prints her own work, with many early graphic works being pulled by hand using a wooden wringer. For example, the 1986 lithograph The Front Verandah, which comments on the Chernobyl disaster, incorporates plates for 15 colours. In its collection, the National Gallery of Australia holds 27 of the artist's prints produced between 1960 and 1996. A catalogue of White's prints is published in The Printworld Directory.

White is a skilled draughtswoman and drawing is the foundation of her art. The media she uses for drawing include pen and ink, ballpoint, brush, crayon, chalk, pastel, conté, and charcoal. From 2005, she has experimented with mixed-media techniques in silverpoint and goldpoint, as well as drawing over inkjet prints. Between 1982 and 1989 White taught drawing in community classes and at evening colleges. In 2000 she co-established anatomy drawing workshops at the University of New South Wales (School of Medical Sciences). She gives occasional lectures in Anatomy Art and has made many drawings from anatomical specimens, culminating in her large 2012 painting The Anatomy Lesson.

== Book ==
In 2005, White wrote and illustrated Draw Like da Vinci. With over 150 images, the book explains seven fundamental drawing principles used by Leonardo da Vinci, as well as his tools and techniques such as silverpoint. She analyses Leonardo's artworks including The Last Supper, Ginevra de' Benci, The Virgin of the Rocks and reveals the skills behind them. Her comment on da Vinci's Vitruvian Man in Sex Change for Vitruvian Man raises "questions regarding the gender specific nature of existing studies on human proportion and bodily geometry in Western art". In 2007, the book was translated into French and published as Dessiner à la manière de Léonard da Vinci. The book has also been translated into Danish (Lær at tegne som Da Vinci) and Hungarian (Rajzoljunk úgy, mint Leonardo da Vinci). Reviews of the English version have appeared on about.com and in Artists & Illustrators.

== Exhibitions ==
White began exhibiting in 1957 and held her first solo in 1962 (Broken Hill); significant solo shows include New York, Cologne, Amsterdam, Munich, Adelaide, Sydney. White has represented Australia in over 60 international biennales, triennales, etc. in US, Germany, Japan, Italy, Spain, Brazil, China, Hungary, Poland, Canada, Yugoslavia, US, and UK. She has also exhibited in group shows in Washington, Stuttgart, Frankfurt, Berlin, Nice, New York, Amsterdam, and Geneva. Australian group exhibitions include the Wynne Prize in 1973 (Nootambulla Gorge) and 1989 (Woman Oppressed), the Sulman Prize in 1976 (The Cup of Tea) and 1991/92 (The Seven Deadly Isms), the Portia Geach Memorial Award (1977: Damian White - Author; 1978: Dr. Brian Freeman; 1980: Autobiography; 1982: Self Portrait with Children; 1992: The Inspired Lecturer; 1997: Me After Brain Surgery; 2003 Go Granny, Go), and the Blake Prize in 1978 (Noah's Rocket), 1982 (The Death of St. Francis of Australia), and in 1988-89 (The First Supper).
