= Mabuhay =

Filipino greeting

Mabuhay (lit. 'to live') is a Filipino greeting, usually expressed as Mabuhay!, which means "long live!". The term is also occasionally used for toasts during celebrations to mean "cheers". It is similar to the Hawaiʻian expression "aloha". It is used in the local hospitality industry to welcome guests, a practice rooted in a 1993 campaign launched by restaurateur Rod Ongpauco to more uniquely welcome foreign visitors to the Philippines.

Mabuhay is also the name of the inflight magazine published by flag-carrier, Philippine Airlines, as well as its frequent-flyer program.

== Historical ==
The word itself has been recorded as a salutation at least early as 1930, when General Douglas MacArthur was sent off amid shouts of “Mabuhay!” In 1941, the Rotarian noted local chapters using it in conveying well wishes to the service organisation. In February 1973, a big cloth sign saying “Mabuhay, Maj. Bob Peel” welcomed released North Vietnam prisoner-of-war, U.S. airman Robert D. Peel, as he stopped by the country as part of Operation Homecoming.

== Current usage ==
The word is otherwise used in its more traditional form as a cheer, especially during celebrations in a variety of contexts:

- “Mabuhay ang Pilipinas! Mabuhay ang Repúblika!”
  (“Long live the Philippines! Long live the Republic!”)
- “Mabuhay ang Pangulo!”
  (“Long live the President!”)
- “Mabuhay ang bagong kasál!”
  (“Long live the newlyweds!”)

=== Viva ===
The Spanish equivalent of ¡Viva! is a special case, as it is today almost always limited to religious contexts. It is specifically used in devotional acclamations directed to God or a patron saint during feast days and assemblies (e.g., “¡Viva, Señor Santo Niño!” “¡Viva la Virgen!”).

== Cognates ==
A number of other Philippine languages have phrases that are cognates of “Mabuhay”. The Bisayan languages, for example, use the term "Mabuhi", while Kapampangans have the phrase "Luid ka".

== See also ==
- Ad multos annos
- Aloha
- Culture of the Philippines
- Filipino language
- Huzzah
  - Hip hip hooray
- Kia Ora
- Merdeka
- Sto lat
- Tagalog language
- Talofa
- Ten thousand years
- The king is dead, long live the king!
