= List of English words of Māori origin =

The following English words are loanwords from the Māori language. Many of them concern native New Zealand flora and fauna that were known prior to the arrival of Europeans in New Zealand. Other terms relate to Māori customs. All of these words are commonly encountered in New Zealand English, and several (such as kiwi) are widely used across other varieties of English, and in other languages.

The Māori alphabet includes both long and short vowels, which change the meaning of words. For most of the 20th century, these were not indicated by spelling, except sometimes as double vowels (paaua). Since the 1980s, the standard way to indicate long vowels is with a macron (pāua). Since about 2015, macrons have rapidly become standard usage for Māori loanwords in New Zealand English in media, law, government, and education. Recently some anglicised words have been replaced with spellings that better reflect the original Māori word (Whanganui for Wanganui, Remutaka for Rimutaka).

== Flora and fauna ==
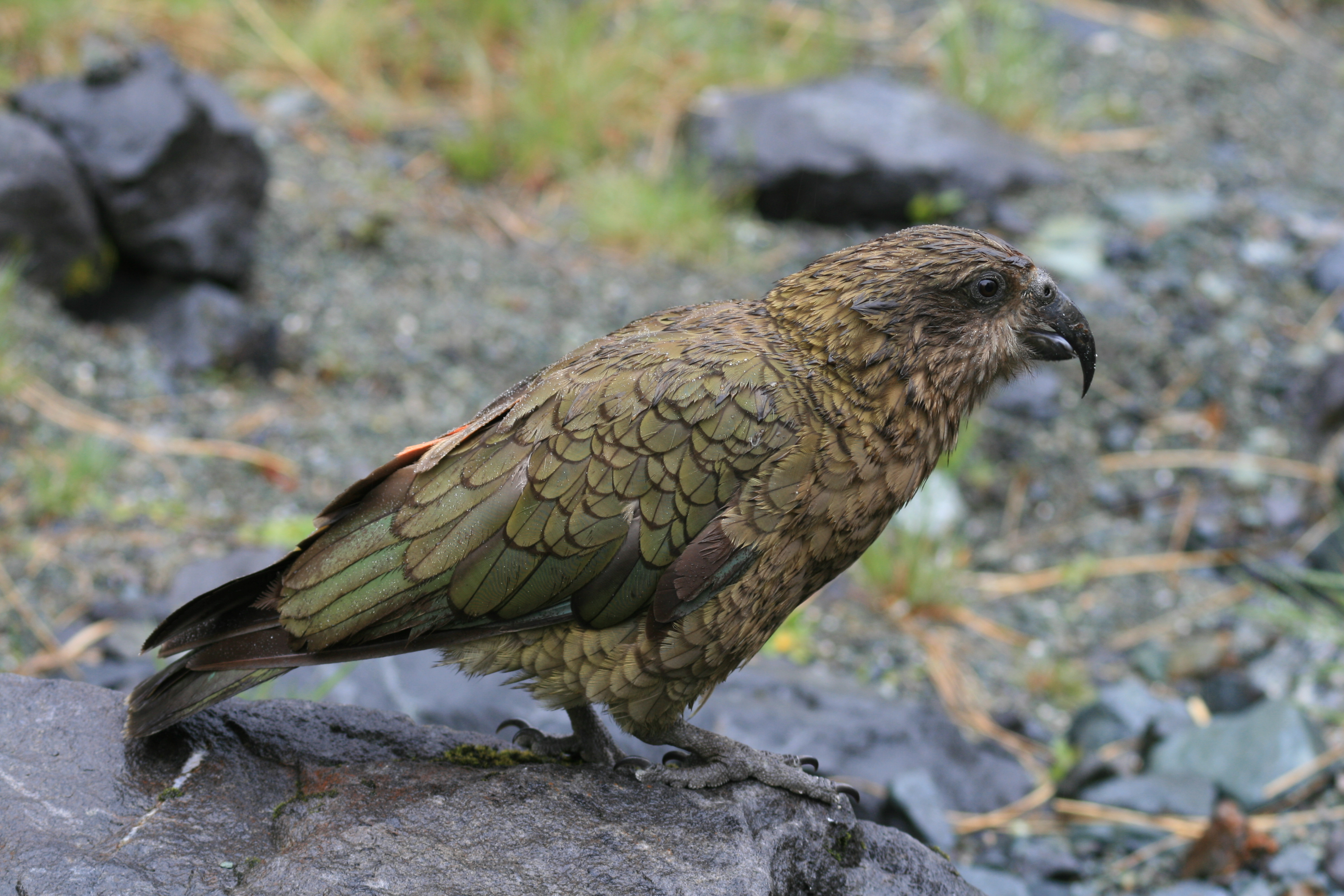
A kea

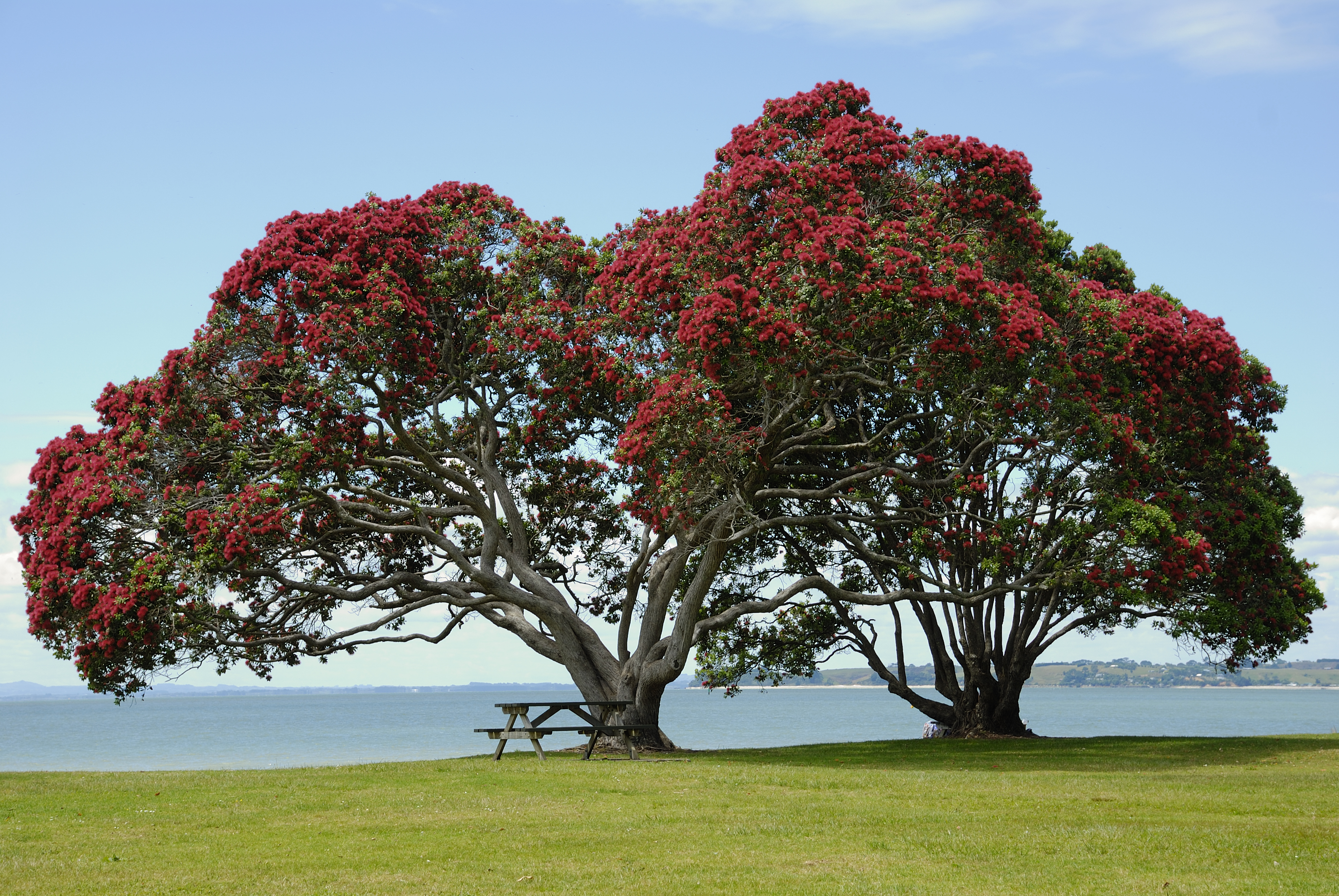
Pōhutukawa trees

The accepted English common names of a number of species of animal and plant native to New Zealand are simply their Māori names or a close equivalent:

huhu
a type of large beetle
huia
a recently extinct bird, much prized traditionally by Māori for its feathers
kākā
a native parrot
kākāpō
a rare native bird
kahikatea
a type of large tree
katipō
a venomous native spider
kauri
large conifer in the Araucariaceae
kea
a parrot, the world's only alpine parrot
kererū
the native wood pigeon
kina
the sea-urchin, eaten as a delicacy
kiwi
the bird, a New Zealander, or (but not in New Zealand English) kiwifruit
kōkako
a rare type of bird
kōwhai
a type of flowering tree
kūmara
sweet potato
mako
a shark, considered a magnificent fighting game fish
mamaku
a type of large tree fern
moa
extinct giant flightless bird
pāua
abalone
pōhutukawa
a type of flowering tree
ponga (also spelt punga)
the silver fern, often used as a symbol for New Zealand
pūkeko
a wading bird, the purple swamphen
rātā
a type of flowering tree
rimu
a tree, the red pine
takahē
a rare wading bird
tarakihi
a common fish, though often mispronounced in English as ‘tera-kee’.
toheroa
a shellfish
tōtara
an evergreen tree
tuatara
rare lizard-like reptile, not closely related to any other living species
tūī
the parson bird
weka
a flightless bird of the rail family
wētā
a large native insect, similar to a cricket
whekī
a type of tree fern

== Placenames ==
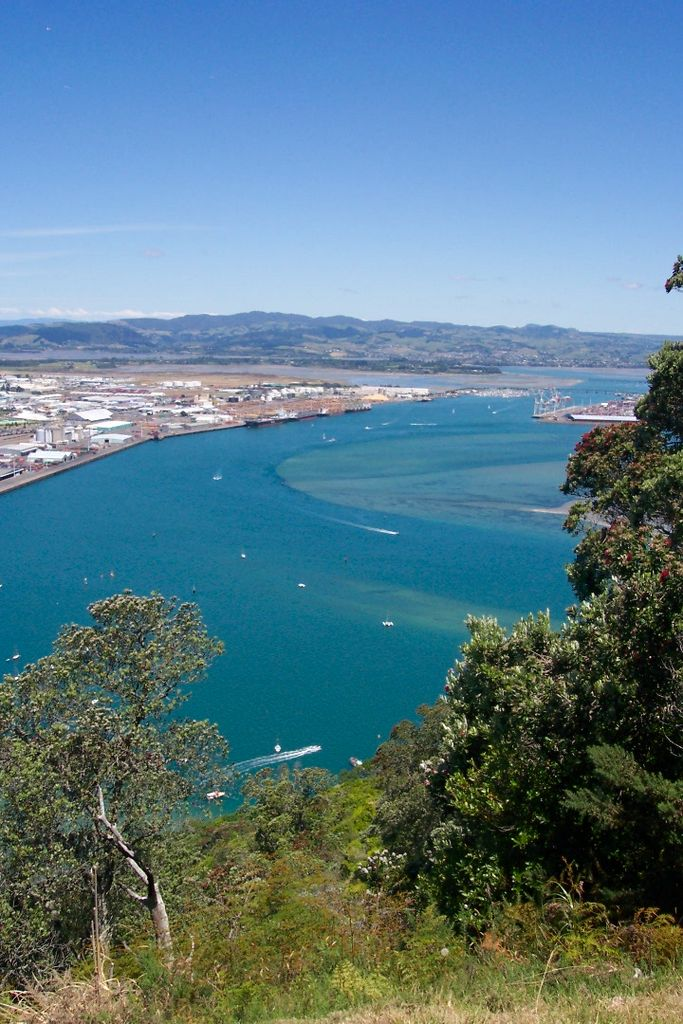
View over Greater Tauranga taken from the top of Mount Maunganui

Thousands of Māori placenames (with or without anglicisation) are now official in New Zealand. These include:

- Territorial authorities: Waikato, Manawatū, Tauranga, Taranaki, Otago
- Cities: Porirua, Rotorua, Tauranga, Timaru, Whanganui, Whangārei
- Tourist destinations: Aoraki / Mount Cook, Tongariro, Manapouri, Moeraki, Wakatipu, Te Anau, Waitomo

Many New Zealand rivers and lakes have Māori names; these names predominantly use the prefixes wai- (water) and roto- (lake) respectively. Examples include the Waikato, Waipa and Waimakariri rivers, and lakes Rotorua, Rotomahana and Rotoiti.

Some Treaty of Waitangi settlements have included placename changes.

A Māori name for New Zealand, Aotearoa, has gained some currency as a more acceptable alternative. It appears in the names of some political parties, e.g. Green Party of Aotearoa New Zealand and Communist Party of Aotearoa.

== Other words and phrases ==
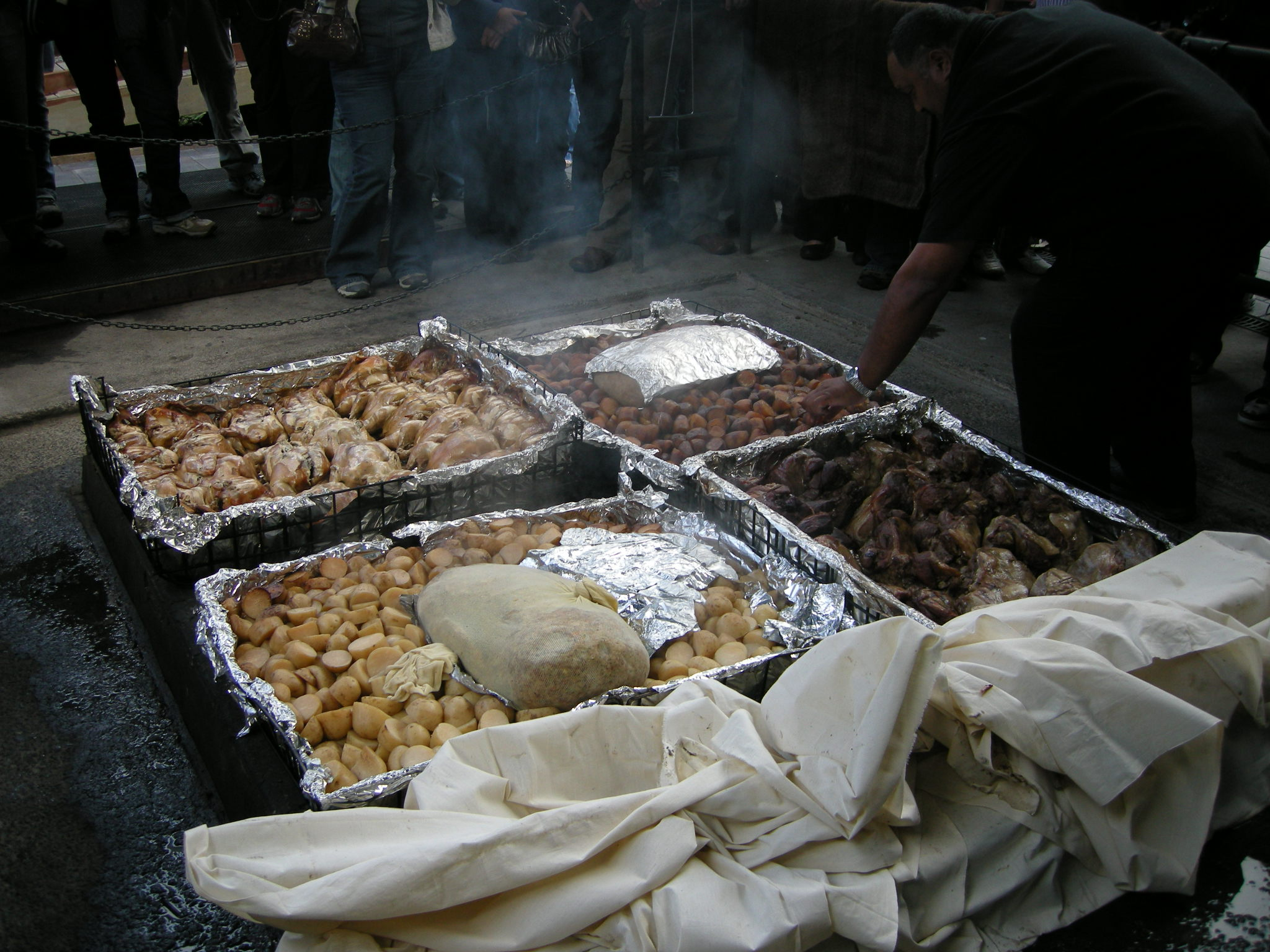
Putting down a hāngī

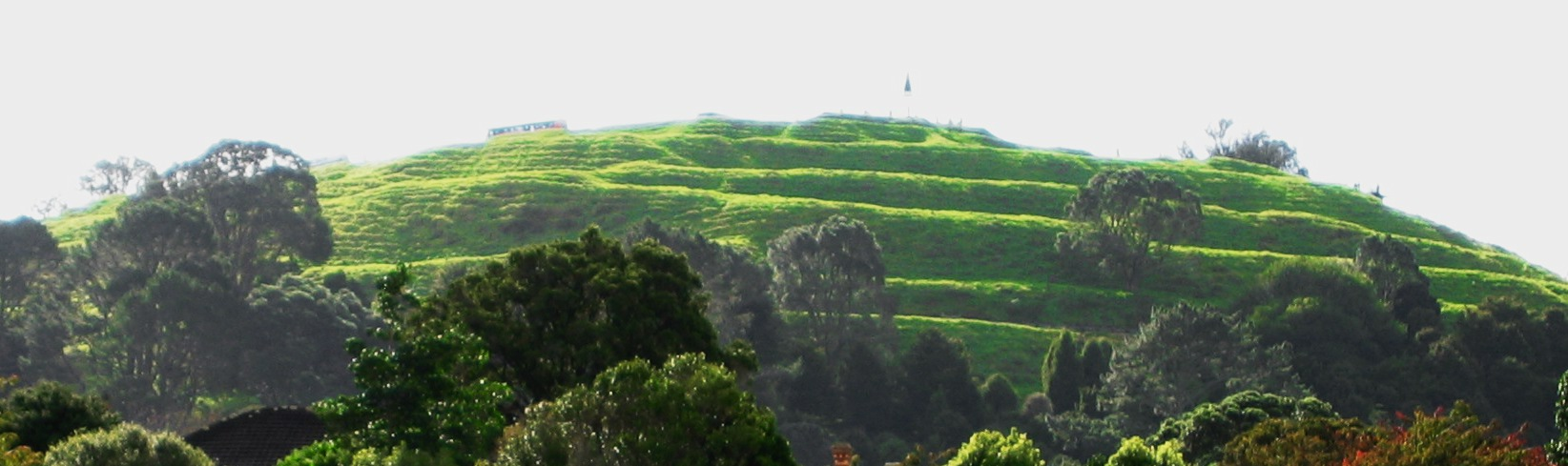
Terraces on Maungawhau / Mount Eden marking the sites of the defensive palisades and ditches of this former pā

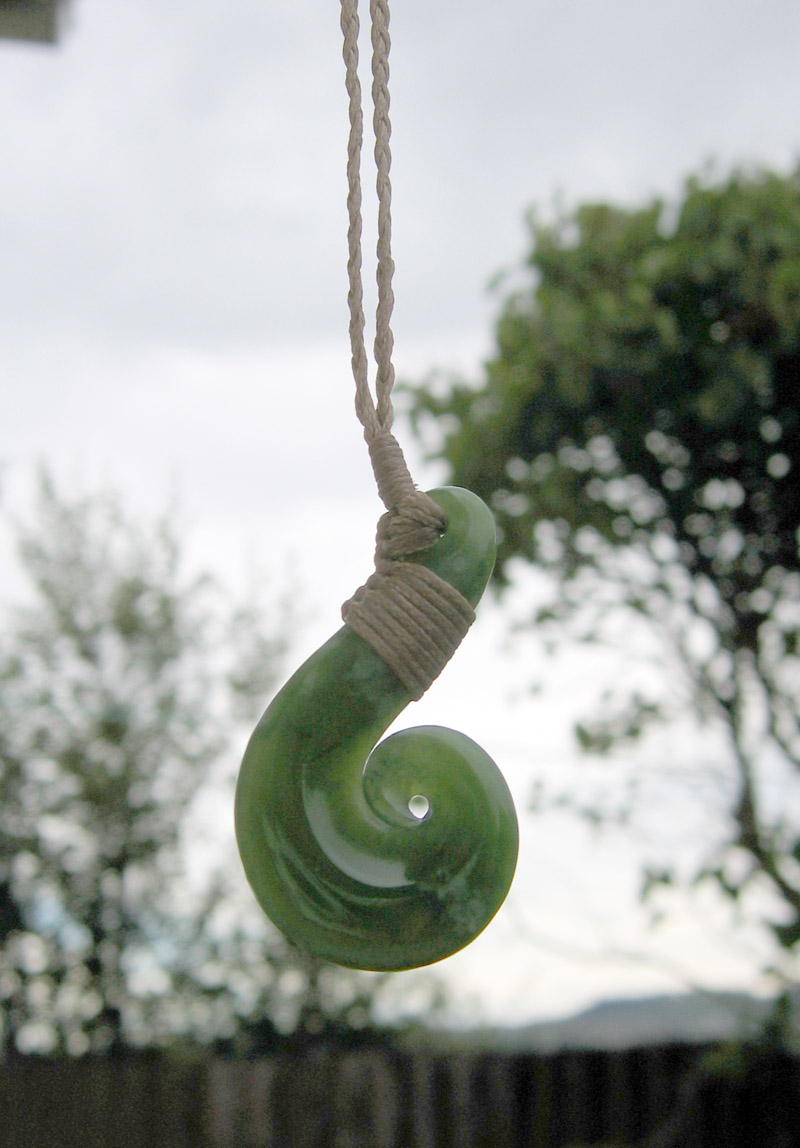
Pounamu pendant

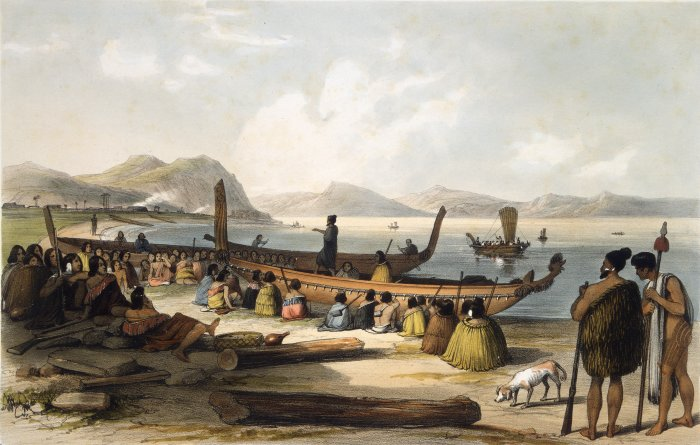
Waka taua (war canoes) at the Bay of Islands, 1827–8. The word has also given rise to the phrase waka-jumping, in New Zealand politics.

The foreshore and seabed hīkoi approaching the New Zealand Parliament. The red, black, and white flags represent tino rangatiratanga.

aroha
love, sympathy, compassion
arohanui
"lots of love", commonly as a valediction
haere mai and haere rā
welcome and goodbye (respectively)
haka
traditional Māori dance, not always a war dance, often performed by New Zealand sports teams to 'challenge' opponents; see Haka of the All Blacks
hāngī
(1) earth oven used to cook large quantities of food (2) the food cooked in the hāngī
hapū
clan or subtribe, part of an iwi
hīkoi
march or walk, especially a symbolic walk such as a protest march
hongi
traditional Māori greeting featuring the pressing together of noses and sharing of breath
hui
meeting, conference
iwi
tribe
kai
food
kai moana
sea food
kapa haka
a cultural festival or music and dance
ka pai
very pleasant, good, fine
karakia
sung prayer or welcome
kaupapa
policy or principle, credo, methodology or theoretical foundation
kāwanatanga
transliteration of the English word "governance," sometimes mistranslated as "sovereignty." See also: tino rangatiratanga and Differences in the Māori and English versions of the Treaty of Waitangi
kia kaha
an expression of support, lit. be strong
kia ora
a greeting, lit. be healthy
koha
gift, present, offering, donation, contribution
kōhanga reo
Māori language preschool (literally 'language nest')
kōrero
to talk; to speak Māori; story
koru
stylised fern frond pattern, used in art
Kura Kaupapa Māori
Māori language school
mahi
work, employment
mahinga mātaitai
traditional seafood gathering place
mana
regard in which someone is held; respect of their authority; reputation
manaia
guardian spirit, often found in Māori artwork and carving
Māoritanga
Māori culture, traditions, and way of life, lit. Māoriness
marae
meeting house, the communal or sacred place that serves religious and social purposes in Māori society
Matariki
midwinter festival, the Māori new year, lit. the star cluster of the Pleiades
mihi
lit. greet, acknowledge; sometimes used for internet board or forum message
moko
facial tattoo
mokopuna
descendants, young children. Lit. grandchildren
Ngaire
woman's name, origin unknown
pā
hill fort
pakarū
broken, not working; often rendered in New Zealand English as puckeroo or puckerooed
Pākehā
New Zealander of non-Māori descent, usually European
Papakāinga
land used as housing by a hapu or whanau group
poi
A dance art that originated in Māori culture and is now popular in object-manipulation communities
pounamu
greenstone, jade, nephrite
pōwhiri
ceremony of welcome
puku
abdomen, tummy
rāhui
a ban or prohibition
rohe
homeland, tribal area
tangata whenua
lit. "people of the land". The home tribe of a given marae or district; locals; by extension, Māori in the New Zealand context.
taniwha
mythical water monster
taonga
treasure, especially cultural treasures. Māori usage: property, goods, possessions, effects, treasure, something prized. The term whare taonga ("treasure house") is used in the Māori names of museums
tapu
sacred, taboo; to be avoided because of this; (a cognate of the Tongan tabu, origin of the English borrowing of taboo)
te reo
the Māori language (literally, 'the language')
tiki
stylised representation of a male human, found in Māori artwork and carving
tino rangatiratanga
a political term, sometimes translated as "chieftainship," but most accurately rendered as "(complete) sovereign authority", a right promised to Māori in the Treaty of Waitangi
tukutuku
traditional woven panels
utu
revenge. Māori usage: revenge, cost, price, wage, fee, payment, salary, reciprocity
wāhi tapu
sacred site
wai
water (often found in the names of New Zealand rivers)
waiata
singing, song
waka
canoe, transport
whakapapa
genealogy, ancestry, heritage
whānau
extended family or community of related families
whare
house, building

== Word list ==
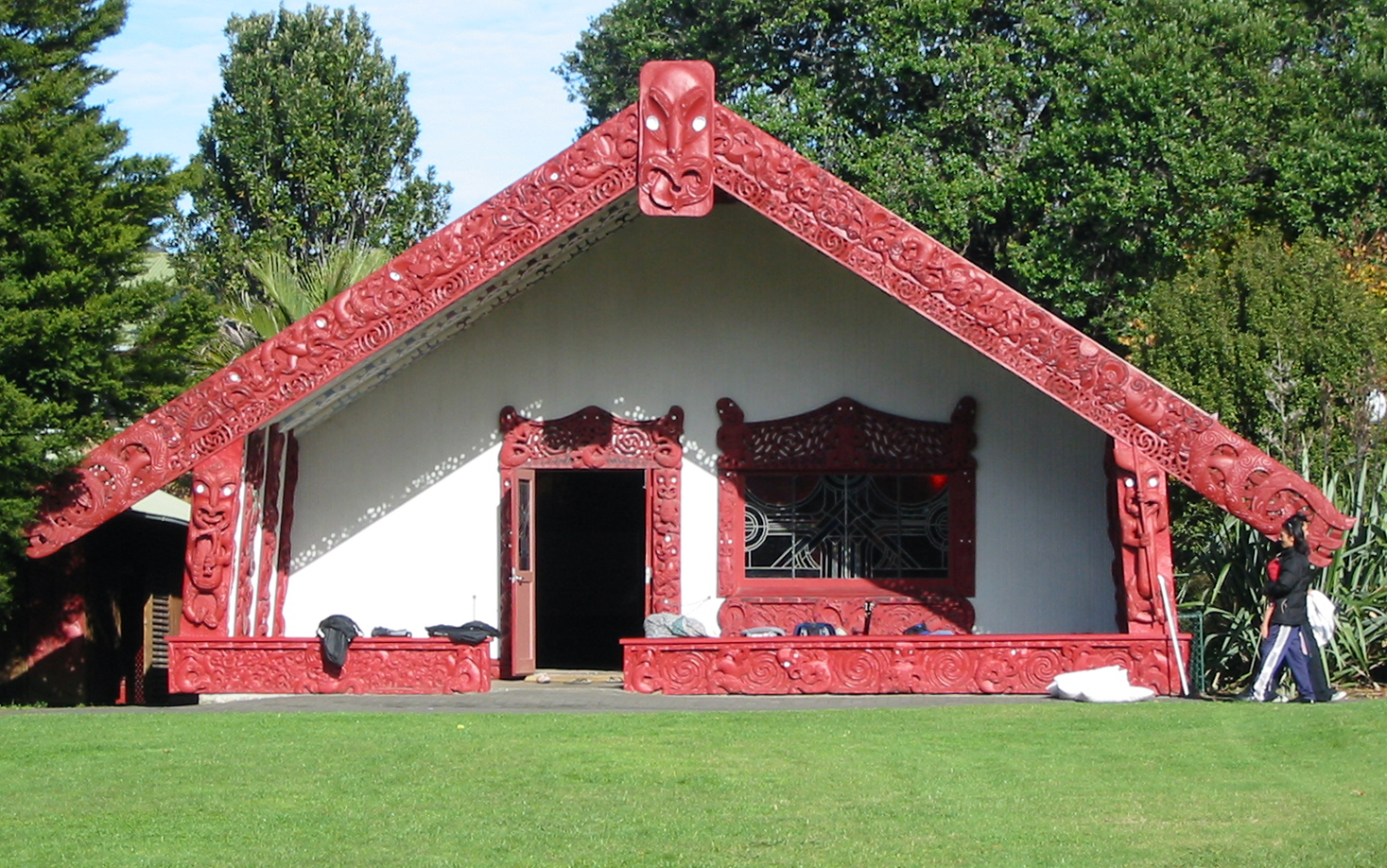
A meeting house on a marae

Many Māori words or phrases that describe Māori culture have become assimilated into English or are used as foreign words, particularly in New Zealand English, and might be used in general (non-Māori) contexts. Some of these are:

- Aotearoa: New Zealand. Popularly interpreted to mean 'land of the long white cloud', but the original derivation is uncertain
- aroha: Love, sympathy, affection
- arohanui: "lots of love", commonly as a complimentary close
- haere mai: welcome
- haka: a chant and dance of challenge (not always a war dance), popularised by the All Blacks rugby union team, who perform a haka before the game in front of the opposition
- hāngī: a method of cooking food in a pit; or the occasion at which food is cooked this way (compare the Hawaiian use of the word luau)
- hongi: traditional Māori greeting featuring the pressing together of noses
- hui: a meeting; increasingly being used by New Zealand media to describe business meetings relating to Māori affairs
- iwi: tribe, or people
- kai: food
- kapai: very pleasant; good, fine. From Māori 'ka pai'
- kaitiaki: guardianship of the environment
- kaupapa: agenda, policy or principle
- kia ora: hello, and indicating agreement with a speaker (literally 'be healthy')
- koha: donation, contribution
- kōhanga reo: Māori language preschool (literally 'language nest')
- kōrero: to talk; to speak Māori; story
- Kura Kaupapa Māori: Māori language school
- mana: influence, reputation — a combination of authority, integrity, power and prestige
- Māoritanga: Māori culture, traditions, and way of life. Lit. Māoriness.
- marae: ceremonial meeting area in front of the meeting house; or the entire complex surrounding this, including eating and sleeping areas
- Pākehā: Non-Māori New Zealanders, especially those with European ancestry
- piripiri: clinging seed, origin of New Zealand English 'biddy-bid'.
- pōwhiri: ceremony of welcome
- puku: belly, usually a big one
- rāhui: restriction of access
- tāngata whenua: native people of a country or region, i.e. the Māori in New Zealand (literally 'people of the land')
- tapu: sacred, taboo; to be avoided because of this; (a cognate of the Tongan tabu, origin of the English borrowing of taboo)
- tangi: to mourn; or, a funeral at a marae
- taniwha: mythical water monster
- te reo: the Māori language (literally, 'the language')
- waka: canoe, boat (modern Māori usage includes automobiles)
- whānau: extended family or community of related families
- whare: house, building

Other Māori words and phrases may be recognised by most New Zealanders, but generally not used in everyday speech:

- hapū: subtribe; or, pregnant
- kapa haka: cultural gathering involving dance competitions; haka team
- karakia: prayer, used in various circumstances including opening ceremonies
- kaumātua: older person, respected elder
- kia kaha: literally 'be strong'; roughly "be of good heart, we are supporting you"
- Kīngitanga: Māori King Movement
- matangi: wind, breeze ("Matangi" is the name for a class of electric multiple unit trains used on the Wellington suburban network, so named after Wellington's windy reputation).
- mauri: spiritual life force
- mokopuna: literally grandchildren, but can mean any young children
- pakarū: broken, damaged
- rangatira: chief
- rohe: home territory of a specific iwi
- taihoa – not yet, wait a while
- tamariki: children
- tohunga: priest (in Māori use, an expert or highly skilled person)
- tūrangawaewae: one's own turf, "a place to stand"
- tutū: to be rebellious, stirred up, mischievous Used in New Zealand English to mean "fidget" or "fiddle" e.g. "Don't tutū with that!"
- urupā: burial ground
- utu: revenge (in Māori, payment, response, answer)
- wāhi tapu: sacred site
- whaikōrero: oratory
- whakapapa: genealogy
- waiata: song
- wairua: spirit

== See also ==
- Māori influence on New Zealand English
- List of English words of Polynesian origin
- List of Māori plant common names
