= Signs of a Nation exhibition panel of the Treaty of Waitangi English text altered by Te Waka Hourua =

Object in the collection of Te Papa museum

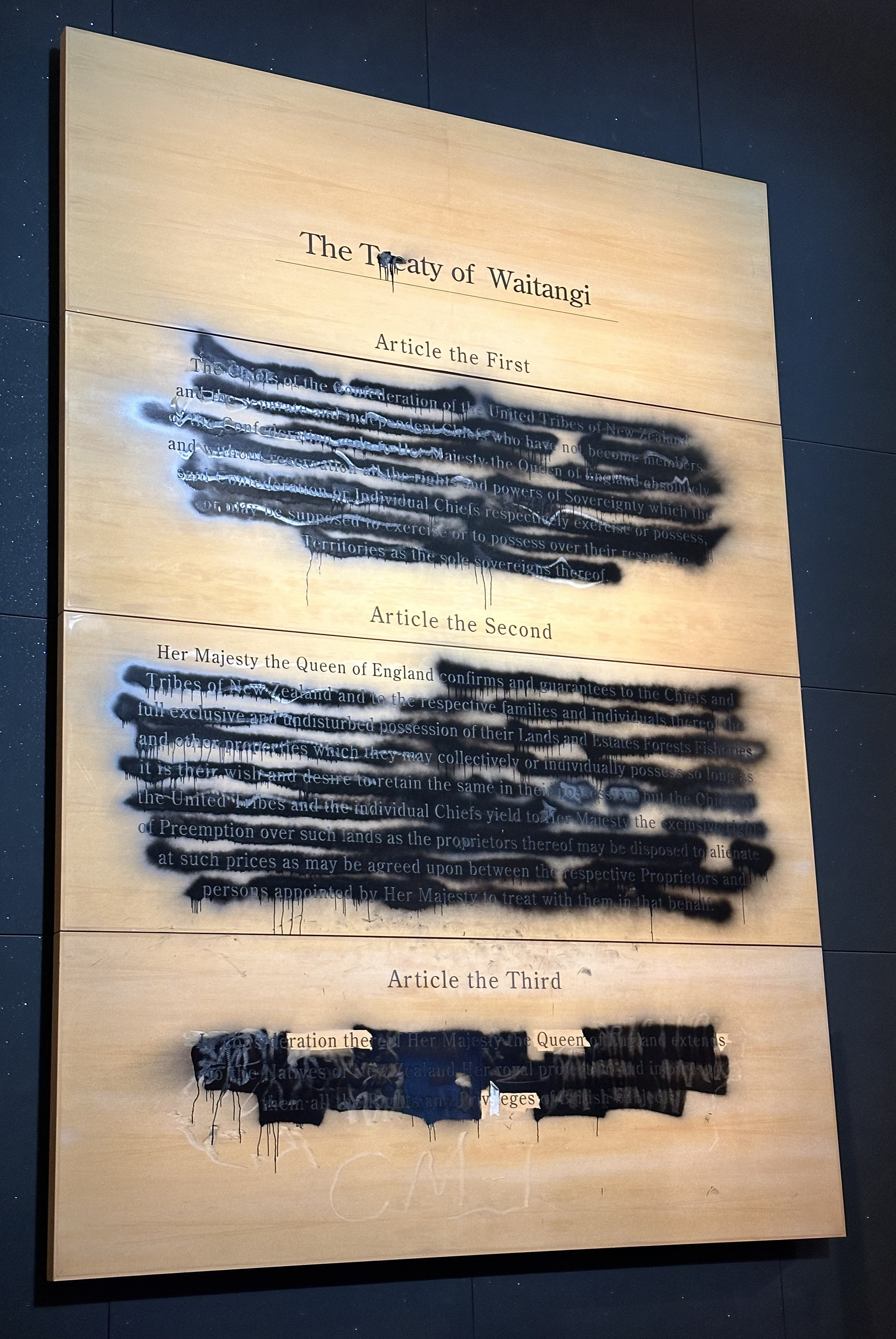
The object on display at Te Papa nine days after its defacement

Signs of a Nation exhibition panel of the Treaty of Waitangi English text altered by Te Waka Hourua is an object in the collection of Te Papa (New Zealand's national museum).

Originally part of the museum's Treaty of Waitangi Signs of a Nation exhibition, the panel was defaced by protesters from the group Te Waka Hourua on 11 December 2023, leaving only the words "No. Her Majesty the Queen of England is the alien. ration the Queen's veges." Twelve members of the group were initially arrested, with eight trespassed and four charged. Later, charges were to be brought against two protestors but the Crown solicitor determined a jury trial was not in the public interest and they were dropped.

Te Papa agreed that change was required regarding the wider exhibit. In 2025, the panel was re-admitted into the museum's collection.

== Physical description ==
The panel is wooden with metal fixings, being large and segmented. The panel is 4.2 m wide and 5.9 m high. It originally depicted the English language text of the Treaty of Waitangi. Following the defacement of the panel, it says the words "No. Her Majesty the Queen of England is the alien. ration the Queen's veges."

== Signs of a Nation exhibition ==
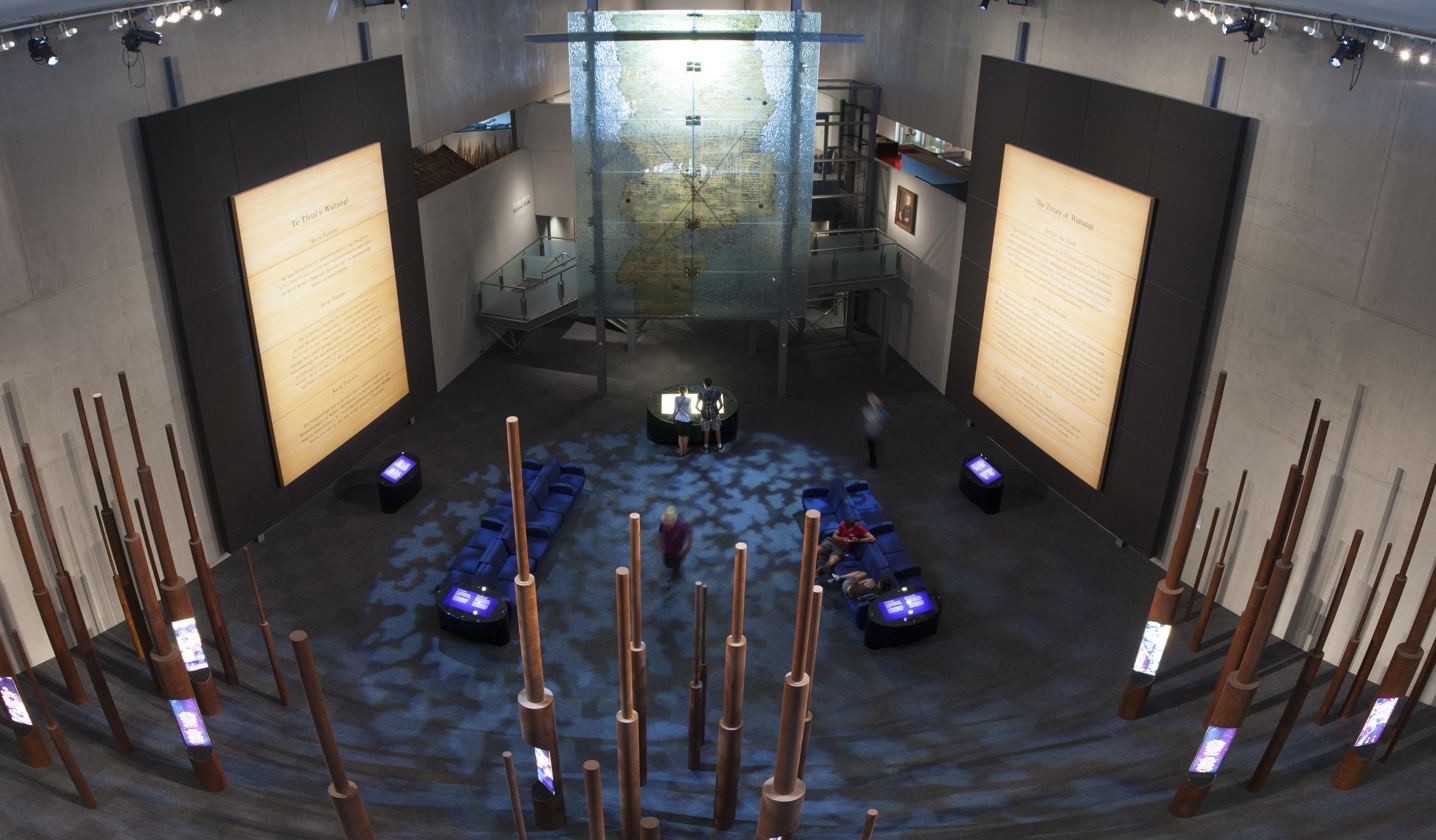
Pre-defacement view of the exhibition, 2015

The Signs of a Nation (Ngā tohu kotahitanga) exhibition opened along with the opening of the new Te Papa museum building in 1998. It was created as part of Te Papa's bicultural mission, of which the Treaty was at the core. Located in a double-height space adjacent to the main atrium it was intended to "arouse feelings of reverence towards the Treaty". The exhibition included two large wooden panels displaying the Māori and English versions of the Treaty facing each other across the space as equals. The topic was contentious, with three separate teams having been tasked with designing the exhibition before being disbanded.

From almost the beginning of Te Papa there was criticism of Signs of a Nation, primarily from inside the museum. A core criticism was that the exhibition presented the Māori and English versions of the Treaty as equal, when the Māori version is generally considered authoritative and differs in several important ways to the English version.

== Defacement protest ==
=== Background ===
Defacement of exhibition panel
- Date: 11 December 2023
- Venue: Te Papa
- Location: Wellington

Te Waka Hourua had lobbied the museum for years for them to make a change to the exhibition, both in person and through email. The group was motivated by the belief that the English version of the Treaty was not an accurate translation and that this led to misconceptions about what had been agreed to. According to the Waitangi Tribunal, the group is correct in that the Māori version is the version signed by Māori, having ceded kawanatanga (government) rather than rangatiratanga (sovereignty) as the English version states.

Leaked correspondence between the museum and Te Waka Hourua revealed that the museum had told the group that they were in the early stages of "renewing and replacing the exhibition" in October 2021. In the email, Te Papa recognised they needed to evolve the exhibit. A spokesperson told Stuff that the changes had not moved past "high level discussions".

=== The protest ===
According to group member Catherine Murupaenga-Ikenn, the group walked into the museum in high-vis vests and acted like they were just workers, which allowed them to set up abseiling equipment to use. By a process of blacking-out letters with spray paint and the use of an angle grinder, the English text of the Treaty on the panel was altered to read "No. Her Majesty the Queen of England is the alien. ration the Queen's veges."

Police arrested twelve people. Initially four were charged, while eight were arrested and trespassed. Te Wehi Ratana was charged with intentional damage and obstructing a police officer, but the charges were dropped in March 2026, with the Crown solicitor determining it was not in the public interest for the case to go before a jury.

Initially, a Te Papa spokesperson told Radio New Zealand that the museum believed that their display made the differences between the versions clear to visitors. Later Te Papa agreed that changes were required. Te Papa reported increased visitor interest in 2024 to the exhibition attributed to the action.

== External exhibitions and performances ==
In 2024, Te Waka Hourua held an exhibition at Enjoy Contemporary Art Space in support of those facing charges. In association with the exhibition, they published a print book Te Waka Hourua whītiki, mātike, whakatika!: whakaaturanga with 174 pages, a compilation of art, articles, suggested corrections to the panel (many signed by the suggester), photos, press clippings and other materials. Also included were letters from members written from Rimutaka prison while they were facing charges related to the 11 December action, and emails and letters of support supporting them in their struggle to raise awareness of the Treaty issues. Te Papa added a copy to its rare books collection.

A one-man play called ration the Queen's veges depicting the protest and its immediate aftermath was staged in 2025.

An exhibition Whai Wāhi ran at Adam Art Gallery at the Wellington campus of Victoria University from 22 November 2025 until 29 March 2026. Works by a number of people associated with Te Waka Hourua were featured alongside the defaced panel. The exhibition included a screen printing event, where attendees screen printed an image of the altered panel onto t-shirts to take away.
