= National colours of New Zealand =

Colours representing New Zealand

The national colours of New Zealand orders include black, white or silver, and red ochre.

== History ==
The Tino Rangatiratanga flag, in the traditional Māori colours of red, black, and white

The national colours of the Māori, an indigenous people of Polynesian origin in New Zealand, are black, white and red.

On 13 March 1975, the Queen's Service Order was created by royal warrant. With the institution of the Queen's Service Order, red ochre was "given official sanction as a national orders colour". This colour has spiritual importance to the Māori by whom it is known as kōkōwai.

In 1989, a competition was run by a group named Te Kawariki to design a national Māori flag. The chosen flag became associated with the tino rangatiratanga or Māori sovereignty movement. It has gradually become a representative flag for Māori across New Zealand, but is still known as the Tino Rangatiratanga flag. In 2009, the Minister of Māori Affairs stated that a Māori flag should be flown at Auckland Harbour Bridge on Waitangi Day, the National Day of New Zealand. The Tino Rangatiratanga flag was recognised as the preferred Māori flag by Cabinet on 14 December 2009. On Waitangi Day 2012, it was flown for the first time at the Wellington Town Hall, and the mayor of Wellington said that it should be the "start of a long-running tradition".

== Decorations ==
In addition to the Queen's Service Order, decorations that include or consist of the national colours are the Order of New Zealand, the New Zealand Order of Merit the New Zealand Operational Service Medal, the New Zealand War Service Medal, and the New Zealand Service Medal 1946–1949.

The Queen's Service Order and Queen's Service Medal both have a ribbon with "central alternating stripes of red ochre (kokowhai), white and black in a descending step pattern from left to right" with a Māori Poutama motif.

The military decorations New Zealand Operational Service Medal, New Zealand War Service Medal, and New Zealand Service Medal 1946–1949 all have black and white ribbons drawn from the national colours.

== Branding ==
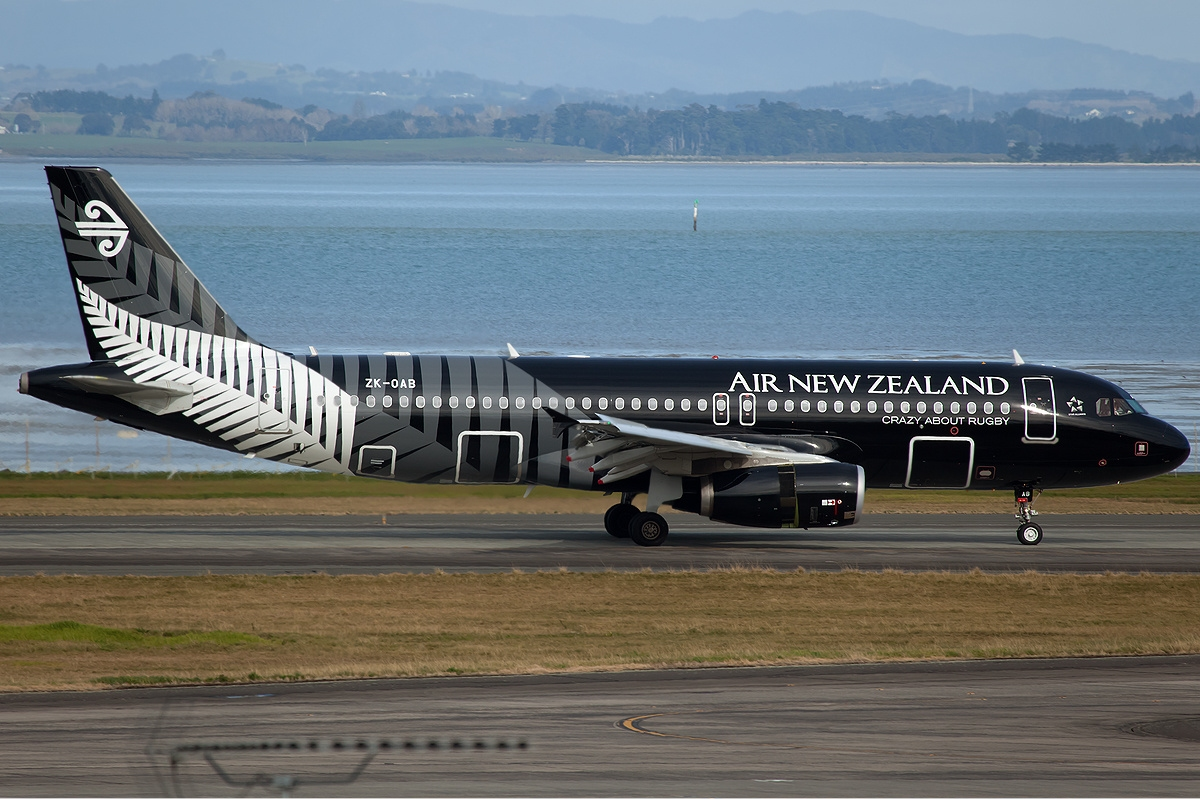
An Air New Zealand Airbus A320 painted black in a sponsorship agreement with the New Zealand national rugby union team (All Blacks) in 2011, with the slogan Crazy about rugby

In August 2012, Air New Zealand introduced its new livery, changing its corporate colours from teal to black, changing its typeface, but retaining the iconic Koru symbol. The first plane to be repainted, an ATR 72–600, was painted almost entirely in black. An Airbus A320, to be delivered in June 2013, will be the first plane to feature white body and black tail livery.

The typeface, designed by Kris Sowersby's foundry Klim Type Foundry, will consist of black lettering on the white body of each plane.

== Sport ==
Many of the national sport teams of New Zealand are associated with the colour black. These include the men's rugby union team (All Blacks), men's cricket team (Black Caps), men's basketball team (Tall Blacks), men's softball team (Black Sox), men's baseball team (Diamondblacks), men's ice hockey team (Ice Blacks), men's field hockey team (Black Sticks Men),women's rugby union team (Black Ferns) and women's field hockey team (Black Sticks Women).

In 2004, Badminton New Zealand tried to brand itself as The Black Cocks, an association to the sport's shuttlecock, as a gimmick to garner attention and sponsorships. It drew sponsorship interest from condom manufacturers, but the International Badminton Federation objected to the name, which has since been abandoned.

White is also used for sport team colours. Because uniform colours in Association football cannot clash with referee uniforms in FIFA tournaments, the men's football team uses white uniforms and is known as the All Whites. The women's softball team is known as the White Sox, and the women's cricket team is known as the White Ferns. At the 2020 Summer Olympics, New Zealand rowers wore white tops instead of black to help counteract Tokyo's hot and humid climate.

In the 1980s, the national cricket team wore beige and brown as their colours.

New Zealand sports teams have occasionally used teal as an accent colour, most notably in cricket. The same colour also has connections with other organisations such as Air New Zealand (see above).

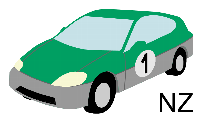

In motorracing, New Zealand's national colours are green (based on British racing green) and white.
