= List of English words of Hawaiian origin =

The Hawaiian language has offered a number of words to the English language. Some Hawaiian words are known to non-Hawaiian speakers, and a few have also been assimilated into the English language (e.g., aloha, meaning "hello", "love", or "goodbye", or mahalo, meaning "thank you"). English also borrows some Hawaiian words (e.g. ukulele, mahimahi, and muʻumuʻu). Hawaiian vocabulary often overlaps with other Polynesian languages, such as Tahitian, so it is not always clear which of those languages a term is borrowed from.

The Hawaiian orthography is notably different from the English orthography because there is a special letter in the Hawaiian alphabet, the ʻokina. The ʻokina represents a glottal stop, which indicates a short pause to separate syllables. The kahakō represents longer vowel sounds. Both the ʻokina and kahakō are often omitted in English orthography.

Due to the Hawaiian orthography's difference from English orthography, the pronunciation of the words differ. For example, the muʻumuʻu, traditionally a Hawaiian dress, is pronounced /ˈmuːmuː/ MOO-moo by many mainland (colloquial term for the Continental U.S.) residents. However, many Hawaii residents have learned that the ʻokina in Hawaiian signifies a glottal stop. Thus, in the Hawaiian language, muʻumuʻu is pronounced [ˈmuʔuˈmuʔu], approximately MOO-oo-MOO-oo. The pronunciations listed here are how it would sound in Hawaiian orthography.

Vowel	Pronunciation
a	[aː], [ɐ] or [ə]
e	[eː], [ɛ], or [e]
i	[iː] or [i]
o	[oː] or [o]
u	[uː] or [u]

Hawaiian word	Meaning	Pronunciation (IPA)	Definition link
ʻAʻā	A kind of rough-surface volcanic rock. Note that there are two glottal stops before and after the first a. Thus, it is not spoken as "ahh", but as "ah-ah".	[ʔəˈʔaː]	Link
Akamai	Intelligent, clever, smart.	[əkəˈmɐj]	Link
Aloha	Hello, goodbye, and love; outside of Hawaiʻi, only the first two meanings are used.	[əˈlohə]	Link
ʻAwa	A Polynesian shrub, Piper methysticum, of the pepper family, the aromatic roots of which are used to make an intoxicating beverage.	[ˈʔɐwə]	Link
Haole	Foreigner or outsider. Usually directed towards Caucasians or people from the mainland. May be said offensively, but is commonly said familiarly.	[ˈhɐo̯le]	Link
Honu	Green sea turtle.	[ˈhonu]	Link
Hula	Ancient Hawaiian form of dance. In the older days, men used to do hula as a sign of masculinity and as a war dance. Also see haka. Many people get confused between the Hawaiian hula (more graceful and slow) and the Tahitian hula (quicker and more hip movements).	[ˈhulə]	Link
Humuhumunukunukuāpuaʻa	The reef triggerfish. It is notorious for its long name, which many struggle to pronounce correctly.	[ˈhumuˈhumuˈnukuˈnukuˈwaːpuˈwɐʔə]	Link
Kahuna	Hawaiian priest, wizard, or shaman; used in the slang phrase "big kahuna".	[kəˈhunə]	Link
Kamaʻāina	Child of the Land, refers to any person born and raised in Hawai’i. Does not describe someone who moves to Hawai’i.	[kəməˈʔaːjnə]	Link
Keiki	A child.	[ˈkejti]	Link
Kukui	The candlenut tree, state tree of Hawaii, so named because the nuts were used as candles. Kukui nut leis were worn by celebrities such as Jessica Simpson and Tyra Banks in 2005–07 and became popular must-have accessories.	[kuˈkuwi]	Link
Lānai	A veranda or patio, from the word lānai (not to be confused with the island, Lānaʻi).	[laːˈnɐj]	Link
Laniakea	The galaxy supercluster that is home to the Milky Way. It means "immeasurable heaven".	[ˈlɐnijəˈkɛjə]	
Lei	A garland of flowers and/or leaves to be worn around the neck (not to be confused with the Romanian lei, plural of leu, meaning the currency).	[lej]	Link
lūʻau	A Hawaiian feast.	[luːˈʔɐw]	Link
Mahalo	Thank you.	[məˈhɐlo]	Link
Mahi-mahi	Dolphin fish; the word means "very strong."	[ˈmɐhiˈmɐhi]	Link
Mana	Magical or spiritual power.	[ˈmɐnə]	
Manō	Shark	[məˈnoː]	
Muʻumuʻu	A loose gown or dress.	[ˈmuʔuˈmuʔu]	Link
ʻOhana	Family, neighborhood. May also mean a guest house where family members stay.	[ʔoˈhɐnə]	Link
Ono	Good to eat. May also refer to the Scombrid Fish, also known as the Wahoo.	[ˈono]	Link
Pāhoehoe	A kind of smooth-surface volcanic rock.	[paːˈhoweˈhowe]	Link
Pele's hair	A type of volcanic glass fibers named after Pele, the Hawaiian fire goddess of volcanoes (see also limu o Pele).	[ˈpɛlɛ]	
Pele's tears	Solidified pieces of lava named after Pele.	[ˈpɛlɛ]	
Poi	A type of Hawaiian food made from mashing corms of the taro plant.	[ˈpowi]	Link
Puka	A hole or perforation. Puka shells are round shells with center holes, strung together to make popular necklaces.	[ˈpukə]	Link
Taboo	From Hawaiian kapu. Also Maori, Tongan, Samoan, Tahitian tapu or Fijian tabu.	[ˈkɐpu]	Link
ʻUkulele	A small guitar-like musical instrument that resembles the Portuguese cavaquinho (literally "jumping flea").	[ˈʔukuˈlɛlɛ]	Link
Wahine	A (Polynesian) woman, a female surfer.	[wəˈhine]	Link
Wiki	Fast; used in the "Wiki Wiki Shuttle" and "English Wikipedia".	[ˈviti]	Link

== See also ==
- Lists of English words of international origin
- List of English words of Polynesian origin
