= Alick Mewa =

Flight Lieutenant Alick Mewa
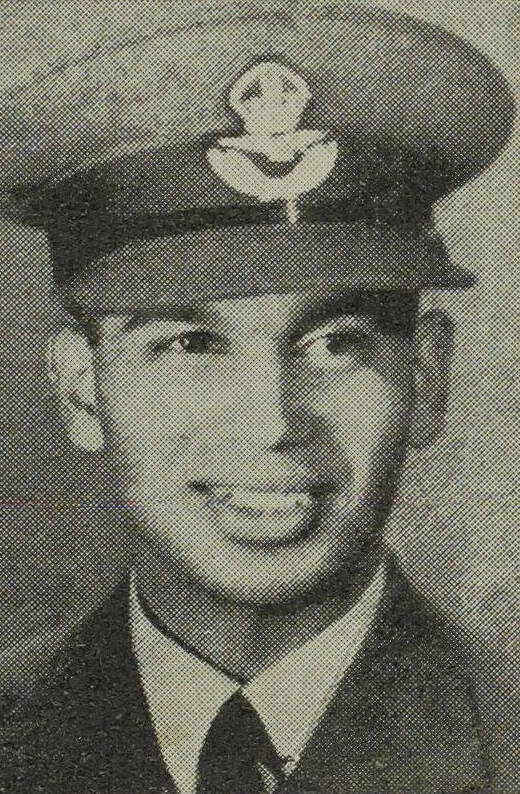
- Alick Mewa in the Auckland Weekly News.
- Born: 23 February 1919; Auckland, New Zealand
- Died: 19 August 1944 (aged 25); Falaise, France
- Military career
- Allegiance: New Zealand
- Branch: Air Force
- Service years: 1940-1944 †
- Rank: Flight Lieutenant
- Service number: 414320
- Unit: No. 98 Squadron
- Awards: War Medal 1939-1945; New Zealand War Service Medal

Alick Mewa (23 February 1919 – 19 August 1944) was a New Zealand World War II soldier of Indian heritage, notable for being the first Indian to gain a commission in the Royal New Zealand Air Force.

== Early life ==
Alick Mewa was born on 23 February 1919 in Auckland, New Zealand, to Ranjan and Piyari Mewa. His father, Ranjan, was drafted in May 1918 during the First World War but was barred from serving in the New Zealand Expeditionary Force due to a policy excluding Indian recruits. Alick received his education at Richmond Road School and later attended Auckland Grammar School. After his education was completed he was employed by the Steel Construction Company.

== Second World War ==
Mewa enlisted in the Royal New Zealand Air Force on 27 July 1941, beginning his training at the Initial Training Wing in Levin. He continued his flying instruction at No. 4 Elementary Flying Training School in Whenuapai from September 1941 and advanced to No. 3 Service Flying Training School in Ohakea in October. On 29 January 1942, he departed for the United Kingdom to complete his training and prepare for operational service.

After arriving in the United Kingdom in March 1942, Mewa began advanced flight training at No. 14 Advanced Flying Unit in Nottinghamshire, where he specialized in night flying. He undertook beam approach courses and trained on various bomber aircraft, including Bristol Blenheims, Armstrong Whitworth Whitley, Douglas Bostons, and North American B-25 Mitchells, at multiple training units across England. In January 1944, Mewa was promoted from flying officer to flight lieutenant.

In July 1944, after completing his crew preparations, Mewa was posted to No. 98 Squadron, part of the 2nd Tactical Air Force supporting the Allied armies in Europe. On 19 August 1944, his aircraft was reported missing during a flare-dropping mission over Falaise, France as part of the battle of the Falaise pocket. Mewa was later presumed dead.

Mewa was awarded the War Medal 1939-1945 and the New Zealand War Service Medal. Mewa is memorialised at the Runnymede Memorial, Auckland War Memorial Museum, and the Auckland Grammar School War Memorial.
