= Mahalo =

Term associated with Hawaiian culture

Mahalo is a Hawaiian word meaning thanks, gratitude, admiration, praise, esteem, regards, or respects. According to the Pukui and Elbert Hawaiian Dictionary, it is derived from the Proto-Polynesian *masalo. Some sources support that the meanings "thanks" and "gratitude" were appended to the word following contact with Westerners. While the word mahalo is found in Lorrin Andrews' 1865 dictionary, the English-Hawaiian section does not provide any Hawaiian word intended to mean gratitude or thanks. Also, early visitors noted that the Hawaiians were generous and grateful people, but had no word to express gratitude or to say "thank you".

== Etymology ==
The Hawaiian Dictionary of Mary Kawena Pukui and Samuel H. Elbert traces the word mahalo to the Proto-Polynesian form *masalo. The Polynesian Lexicon Project (POLLEX), however, reconstructs the form to the Nuclear Polynesian level as *masalo "be astonished at, admire." POLLEX finds a wide range of words with the same origin in other languages, including the Rapa Nui word maharo and the Māori word mīharo. Of the languages listed in POLLEX, however, only the Hawaiian form can also be taken as an expression of thanks or gratitude.

The missionary lexicographer Lorrin Andrews, in his 1865 Dictionary of the Hawaiian Language, treated mahala and mahalo as variants of a single verb derived from ma and halo, defining it as "to look out; to turn the eyes upon."

== History of the meaning ==
Some early Western visitors to Hawaii speculated that the Hawaiian language had no expression for gratitude. John B. Whitman, in his 1813–1815 journals, wrote that "they have no term synonimous [sic] with gratitude." One early visitor, Lorrin Andrews, pinpointed the verb mahalo as meaning "to admire; to wonder at; to magnify the goodness or virtues of a person or thing" and defined the noun as meaning "wonder; surprise; admiration." Andrews did not, however, identify mahalo as an expression of thanks. In a 1922 revision to Andrews' dictionary, "thanks" was added as an additional sense of the noun mahalo.

Pukui and Elbert, in their 1986 dictionary, provided "thanks, gratitude; to thank" as the primary sense of the word mahalo and described "admiration" as being a secondary sense.

== Usage ==
Mahalo is used in both the Hawaiian and English languages. Pukui and Elbert describe it as fitting both into the phrase mahalo ā nui ("thanks very much") and ʻōlelo mahalo ("compliment"). The word has been borrowed into English, with Dictionary.com describing the first English use as being around 1890–1895. Elizabeth Ball Carr's 1972 review of Hawaiian Pidgin, Da Kine Talk, identified mahalo as one of the most common Hawaiian words heard in English conversations in Hawaii.

== See also ==
- Aloha
- List of English words of Hawaiian origin
