= List of English words of Polynesian origin =

The following words used in English exist as loanwords from one or more Polynesian languages.

Words from Hawaiian and Māori are listed separately at List of English words of Hawaiian origin and List of English words of Māori origin respectively.

Kava
An intoxicating drink made from plant roots. From Tongan and Marquesan.
Mai Tai
An alcoholic drink made from rum, curaçao, lime juice, orgeat syrup, and simple syrup. From Tahitian "maita'i", meaning 'good' supposedly from a quote by Carrie Guild, a Tahitian, who, after sampling the drink at Trader Vic's bar in Oakland, said "Maita'i roa ae" meaning 'exceedingly good'.
Taboo
A social and/or spiritual prohibition. From Tongan "Tapu". Loanwords were acquired during Captain James Cook's voyages.
Tamure
a dance. From Tahitian.
Tapa
Bark cloth used for loincloths (Maro), turbans (Pare), kilts (Pāreu) and Cook Island Māori/Tahitian ponchos (Tīputa). From Tahitian and Cook Island Māori. Commonly used to refer to Tongan, Samoan and Niuean bark cloth (Ngatu/Hiapo/Siapo) which differs from Tapa in that it is thicker, produced differently with different materials, colorfully dyed and highly decorated with patterns and pictures.
Tattoo
a form of body modification using indelible inks. From Tahitian Tatau.
Tiki
Carving in humanoid form. From various Eastern Polynesian languages.
Tu'i
Tribal chieftain. From Tongan.

== See also ==
- Māori influence on New Zealand English
