= Naida Glavish =

New Zealand politician and Māori community leader

Dame Naida Glavish DNZM JP
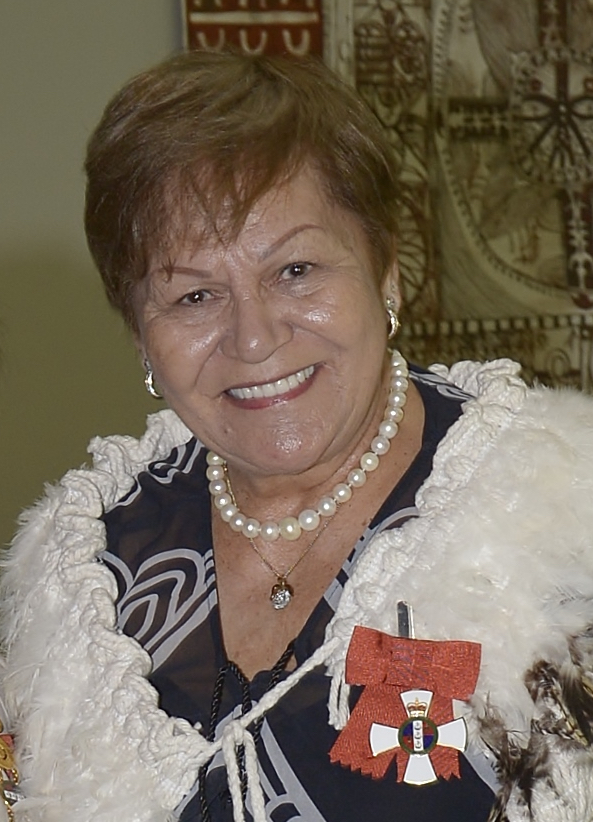
- Glavish in 2018

President of the Māori Party
- In office 2013–2016

Personal details
- Citizenship: New Zealand
- Party: Māori Party

Dame Rangimārie Naida Glavish DNZM JP (/ˈɡlævɪʃ/ GLAV-ish; born 1946) is a New Zealand politician and Māori community leader from the Ngāti Whātua iwi. From 2013 to 2016, she was President of the Māori Party.

== Early life and career ==
Glavish is affiliated to Ngāti Whātua and also of Croatian descent. Her Croatian grandparents arrived in New Zealand in the 20th century, settling near Kaipara Harbour and changing the spelling of their name from the original Glavaš. Their son, Frank (d. 2013), is Glavish's father; her mother is named Nohotakitahi. Before the Māori language revival of the 1980s, it was common for children with Māori first names to be called an anglicised name instead. Glavish's mother's name was abbreviated to Nora; she herself was called Naida rather than Rangimārie.

When Glavish was twelve she was placed into state care after admitting to stealing clothes from a washing line; in a 2015 interview Glavish said it was actually a cousin who did this. She was not returned to her family until she was sixteen.

At seventeen, she married and had six children. Eventually she would separate from her husband. In 1975 she went back to work as a telephone operator for the New Zealand Post Office.

== The "kia ora" incident ==
In 1984, at a time when the use of Māori phrases was uncommon in New Zealand, Glavish, who was then an Auckland telephone operator, was instructed to stop using kia ora when greeting callers after the post office had received a complaint. She refused to do so and was consequently demoted, with the whole affair attracting much public interest. She was later given back her original job. The Postmaster-General, Rob Talbot, convinced the Prime Minister, Robert Muldoon, to overturn the prohibition on Māori greetings by telephone operators.

== Advocacy work ==
After "the Kia Ora incident" Glavish trained as a Māori language teacher before beginning a career as a Māori cultural advisor predominantly in the health sector.

== Political career ==
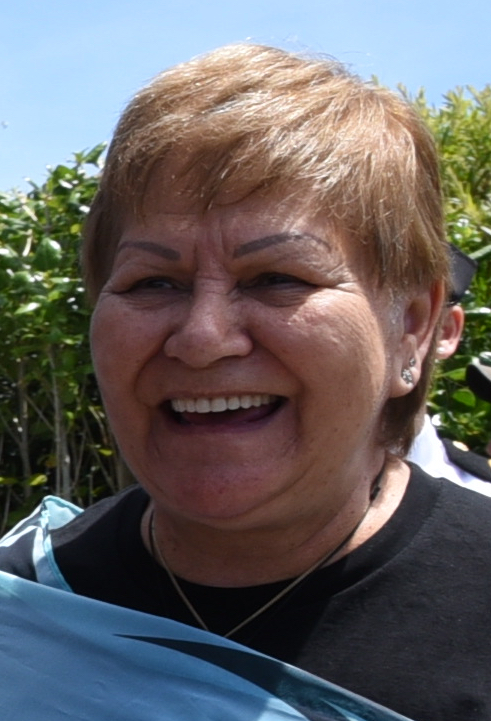
Glavish at Te Tii Waitangi Marae in February 2017

A member of Mana Motuhake, Glavish stood for the Alliance in the Te Tai Tokerau electorate at the 2002 general election, finishing third out of nine candidates. She was ranked tenth on the Alliance party list, and consequently was not elected to Parliament as the Alliance's party vote did not reach the five percent threshold. When Tariana Turia left the Labour Party over the Foreshore and Seabed Act 2004 and subsequently formed the Māori Party, Glavish became a "staunch supporter" of the new party.

At the 2008 general election, Glavish was a list-only candidate for the Māori Party, ranked at number eight on their list, but was not elected to Parliament. She was President of the Māori Party from 2013 to 2016. She stood again on the Māori Party list, with a ranking of 11th, at the 2014 general election, and once more was unsuccessful. As party president, she did not favour reconciling with Hone Harawira's Mana Movement, which had broken off from the Māori Party in 2011.

She did not seek re-election to the presidency in 2016 and was succeeded by Tuku Morgan.

== Honours ==
In the 2011 New Year Honours, Glavish was appointed an Officer of the New Zealand Order of Merit (ONZM) for services to Māori and the community. In the 2018 New Year Honours, she was promoted to Dame Companion of the New Zealand Order of Merit (DNZM), also for services to Māori and the community, and therefore granted the title dame. Glavish commented that she is the first dame in her hapū. Acknowledging that use of te reo Māori and Māori names is now more commonplace in New Zealand, Glavish is styled as Dame Rangimārie (rather than Naida).

In 2024, Glavish received the Oranga Angitu – Lifetime Achievement Award from the Māori Language Commission.

Party political offices
Preceded by Pem Bird	President of the Māori Party; 2013 to 2016	Succeeded by Tuku Morgan
