= Flag of the United Tribes of New Zealand =

- The current version of the Flag of the United Tribes of New Zealand
- Te Kara
- Adopted: 1834
- Design: A Saint George's Cross with the canton consisting of a blue field, another St. George's cross with white fimbriation, and a white, eight-pointed star in each of the quarters.
- Designed by: Henry Williams
- Alternative version with black fimbriation

- Alternative version with no fimbriation

The flag of the United Tribes of New Zealand (Māori: Te Wakaminenga o nga Hapu o Nu Tireni) or Te Kara (Māori for 'the colours') is a flag originally designed by Henry Williams to represent the New Zealand Church Missionary Society. It was adopted as a national flag by a group of rangatira (Māori chieftains) in 1834 and is today more closely associated with the Māori people.

== Description ==
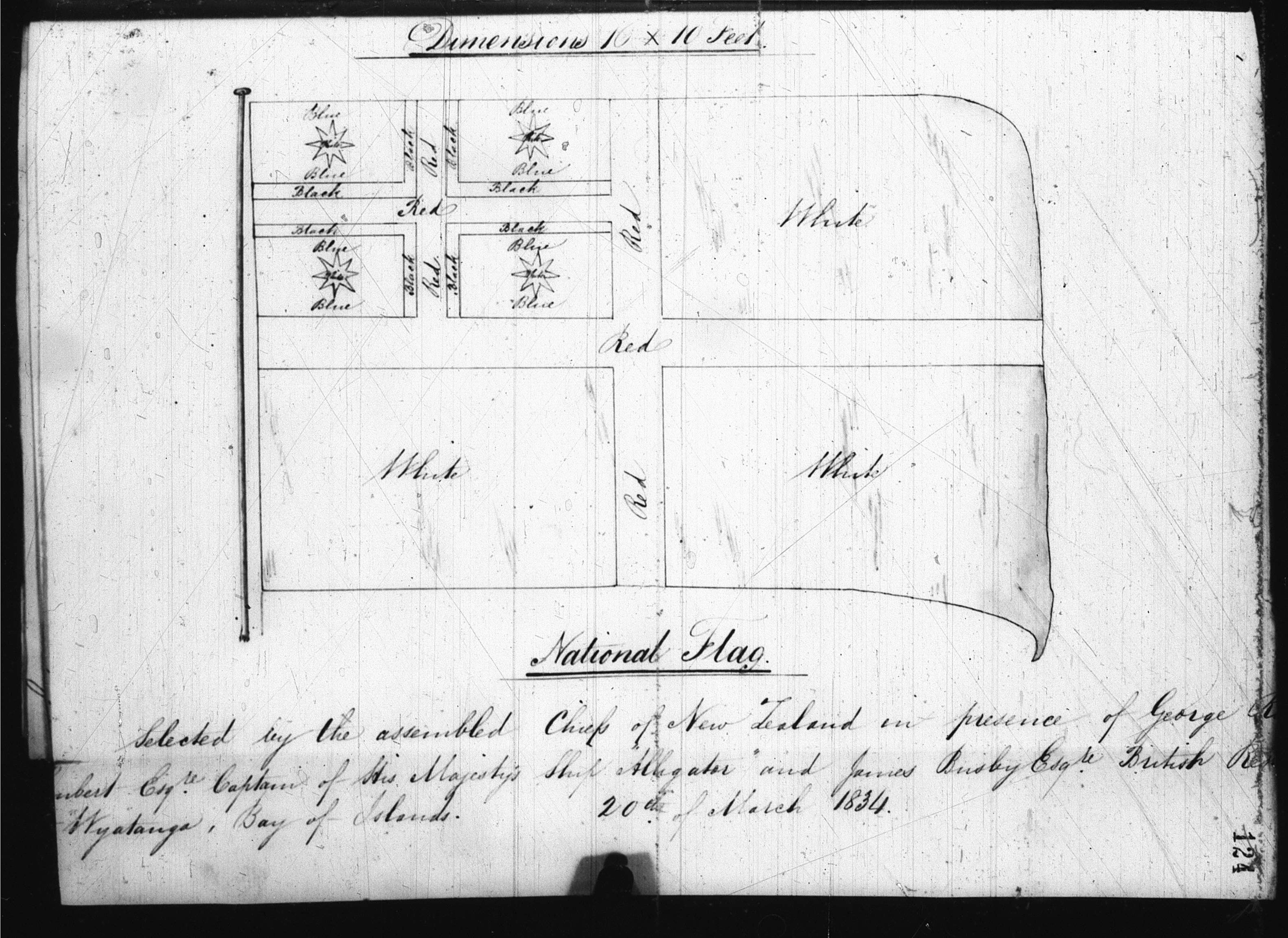
The drawing of Te Kara that James Busby sent to the Colonial Office following its 1834 adoption. The drawing shows the original specification of black fimbriation and eight-pointed stars.

The flag of the United Tribes of New Zealand with 6-pointed stars.

The flag of the United Tribes of New Zealand with 5-pointed stars.

Te Kara is a St. George's Cross flag. In the canton is another St. George's cross on a field of blue, with a white star in each quadrant. The flag adopted by the United Tribes in 1834 had black fimbriation around the canton cross, though it was changed to white shortly after, following the rule of tincture. Flags without any fimbriation have also been used. The 1834 flag's stars had eight points, which is still the most common number, though five- and six-pointed versions have also been used.

The exact meaning of the flag's design is not specified in early documents. Generally, the St. George's Cross represents England, having been used as its national flag since the 12th century. The St. George's cross may represent designer Williams' affiliation with the Church of England, it being common practice for its member churches to fly the cross with the arms of their diocese in the canton. The stars have been speculated to represent the Southern Cross, but 20th-century historian and New Zealand flag scholar James Laurenson argues they are stars of England, religious symbols with roots in British heraldry.

In traditional Māori culture, the trifecta of colours hold symbolic significance: vitality and life force (red), peace, light and spiritual connection (white), and the ocean as well as spiritual connection between the people and environment (blue), inter alia.

== History ==
=== 1823–1833: Use as Church Missionary Society flag ===
The design was first used by the Evangelical Anglican group New Zealand Church Missionary Society. Henry Williams, the society's leader from 1823 to his dismissal from the society in 1849, was a former sailor with the British navy and a naval enthusiast. It was likely his experience with naval ensigns that inspired him to create a flag for his society. Williams styled the flag of the Church Missionary Society like the British White Ensign, which is also a St. George's Cross with a flag in the canton. The flag Williams designed was used by the society on its ships and at its mission stations.

The McDonnell flag that flew aboard the Sir George Murray. The colour of the moon is not specified in any source.

In 1830, the ship Sir George Murray, which was built in New Zealand, sailed to Sydney, Australia, where it was impounded when authorities deemed that it did not meet the British maritime law that required all trading ships to fly a national ensign. New Zealand was not then a British colony and could not use the British flag. The Murray was sold at auction to Thomas McDonnell in early 1831. When it returned to Sydney later that year it flew a flag that The Sydney Herald called "the New Zealand colours", though it never had official recognition. McDonnell's flag was similar to Williams' Church Missionary Society flag, likely also inspired by the white ensign. It contained a St. George's cross with a blue canton charged with a half moon.

=== 1833–1840: Use as national flag of New Zealand ===
The flag design rejected by James Busby for not containing enough red

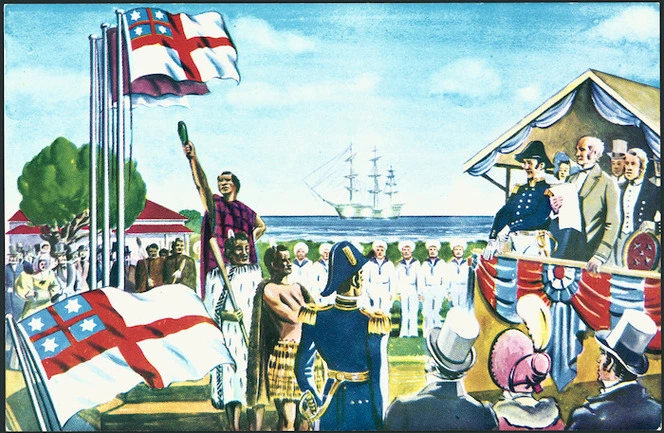
A postcard from the 1900s depicts the 1834 vote to adopt the flag, including HMS Alligator anchored nearby.

In 1833, James Busby arrived in New Zealand with the official role of British resident. One of his first acts while in the position was to identify a national ensign. Busby reasoned a flag would resolve the issues with Australian customs authorities, and give the Māori a sense of collective nationality. Busby wrote to the Colonial Secretary of New South Wales Alexander Macleay with the idea, to which Macleay agreed. Macleay suggested his own design with nine alternating stripes of blue and white with a Union Jack in the canton, but Busby declined to include the flag in the later vote, deeming it to not have enough red, a colour favored by the Māori.

With the Australian colonial government's blessing, Busby set about selecting a flag for New Zealand. Busby recruited the head Church Missionary Society reverend Henry Williams to create the designs. Three designs, including the Church Missionary Society flag, were sent back to New South Wales to be manufactured. On 20 March 1834, with three proposed flags flying underneath the English flag, Busby held a vote at his residence. Missionaries, naval captains, and 30 of the local rangatira were in attendance. Though only the rangatira were allowed to vote, debate among them was suppressed and the vote was influenced by the Europeans and Americans in attendance who suggested which flags the chiefs should vote for. The Church Missionary Society flag received twelve votes, winning by a two-vote margin. The two other flags by Williams receiving 10 and six respectively, with two rangatira abstaining from voting. Busby declared it the first "national act" of the New Zealand chiefs.

Upon identifying the results, Te Kara was raised from a flagpole and HMS Alligator, the ship that had brought the manufactured flags back from New South Wales, gave the flag a 21-gun salute. Busby wrote a letter to King William IV to request his recognition of the flag. When he received a letter in the affirmative in September of that year, there was again a formal flag raising and a celebration.

=== 1840–present: Use as a Māori flag ===
In 1839, the British Crown appointed naval officer William Hobson with the task of establishing a Crown colony in New Zealand. On 5 February 1840, just eight days after arriving in New Zealand, William Hobson oversaw the signing of the Treaty of Waitangi, a process during which more than 500 Māori relinquished certain land and rights to the British Crown, though the content of the treaty and the circumstances of its signing have been a subject of controversy ever since.

In May of that year, while the treaty was still being distributed around the country, Hobson received word that Te Kara was being flown by the New Zealand Company, a commercial enterprise with a business model based on systematic colonisation. Hobson quickly wrote documents declaring absolute sovereignty over New Zealand on behalf of the United Kingdom, and sent armed soldiers from Port Nicholson (now Wellington Harbour) to remove the flag, which was perceived by Hobson as a symbol of independence. A similar incident occurred on 30 June when Hobson sent an armed party to remove Te Kara from a flagstaff in Petone. The guards raised the Union Jack on the flagstaff the following day.

The replacement of the New Zealand flag by the Union Jack became a point of contention among the Māori, many of whom were becoming increasingly unhappy with the outcome of the Treaty of Waitangi. Hōne Heke, a rangatira who was the first to sign the treaty, had been assured by the flag designer Henry Williams that the document protected the authority of the Māori leaders. Expecting the Māori would have equal status with the colonial government, Heke believed Te Kara should fly alongside the British flag. On 8 July 1844, with Heke's knowledge and approval, a party of Māori cut down the flagstaff at Flagstaff Hill in Kororāreka (now Russell) that flew the British flag. A little more than a week later, Heke proposed in a letter to Hobson that the flagstaff should fly Te Kara, setting a date to meet to discus the proposal. Hobson did not meet with the Māori party at the appointed time, and the colonial powers at Russel raised the British flag on the staff once again. Heke removed the flagstaff three more times, escalating in the Flagstaff War. After several major conflicts, such as the Battle of Kororāreka, the Battle of Ōhaeawai, and the siege of Ruapekapeka, the flagstaff was ultimately removed and neither Te Kara nor the British flag flew from Flagstaff Hill.

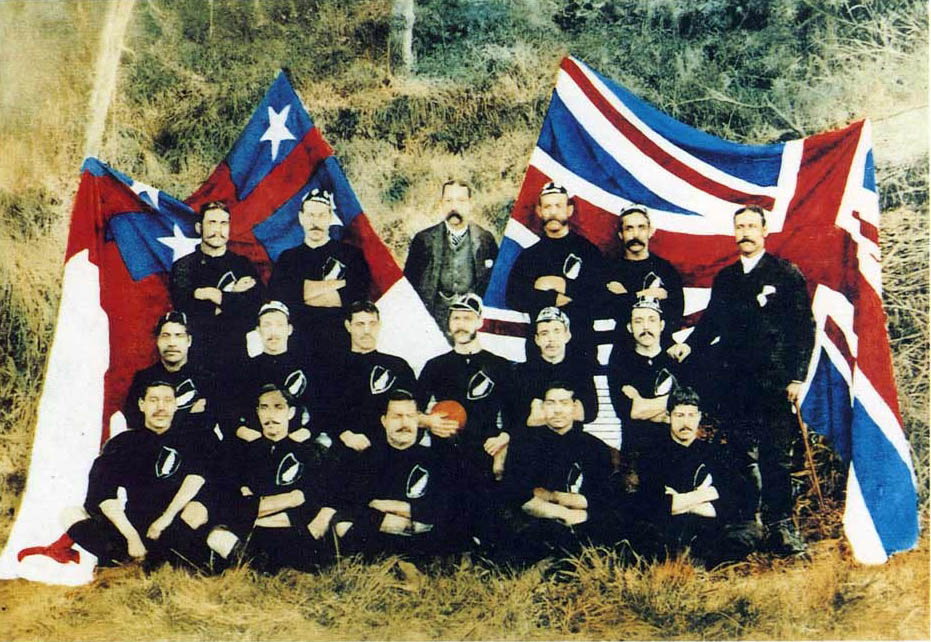
The 'native' rugby team in front of Te Kara and the Union Jack in 1889

The Union Jack continued to be the 'superior flag' of New Zealand through 1965 even as, beginning in 1867, modified blue ensigns were adopted as the flags of the New Zealand. However, some Māori people continued to fly Te Kara through the turn of the 20th century. It was used by Māori sovereignty movements such as Kingitanga and Te Kotahitanga. It was used as the symbol of the touring 'native' rugby team. By the early 1900s Te Kara reputation as a flag of the Māori people, rather than of the nation of New Zealand, was solidified, and it began being identified as 'the Māori flag' in popular press.

=== 1970–present: Use in protest movements and the selection of new Māori flag ===
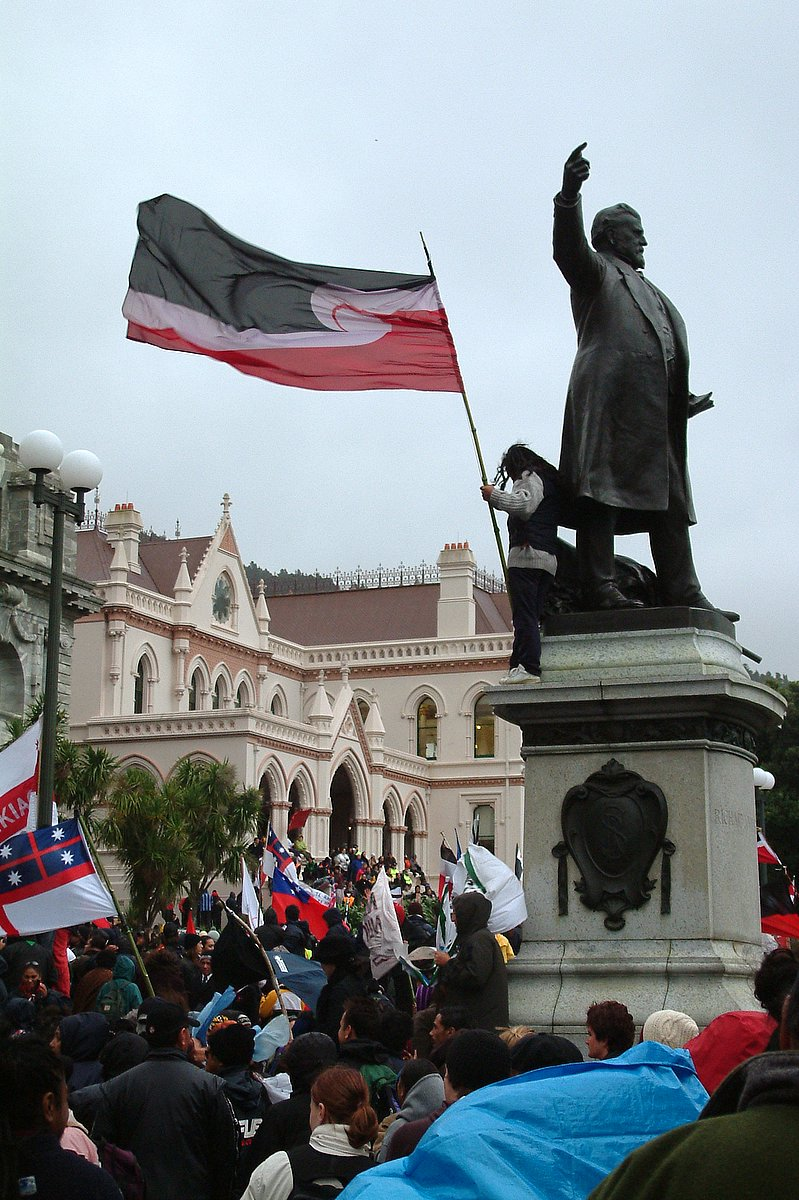
The national Māori flag (top center), Te Kara (bottom left), and several other flags were used at protests in the 2004 New Zealand foreshore and seabed controversy.

Te Kara gained a resurgence in use from the 1970s to the turn of the 21st century, in conjunction with the modern Māori protest movement. Since 1974, Te Kara has flown below the national New Zealand flag on the historic flagstaff in Waitangi. In 1990, members of the Māori independence group Te Kawariki created Tino Rangatiratanga, a new flag to represent the Māori people that quickly gained popularity. In 2008, after pressure from Māori organisers, Prime Minister John Key agreed to fly a Māori flag from Auckland Harbour Bridge provided there was consensus on which flag to fly. A nationwide consultation process found that 80% of voters, most of whom were Māori, preferred the newer Tino Rangatiratanga design as a symbol of the Māori people.

Since 2020, Te Kara appeared in protests against the COVID-19 vaccine and New Zealand's COVID-19 restrictions. Its use by the protestors, most of whom were non-Māori, was criticised by Māori. Researchers studying COVID-19 misinformation in New Zealand associated Te Kara's presence in the demonstrations as consistent with the overall increase in the number of white supremacists using Māori culture to promote their agendas.

== Modern perception ==
Te Kara continues to be used by some Māori to represent their nation and culture, though it has fallen out of favour among the majority of Māori people. In the 2008 search to identify the national Māori flag, Te Kara, the New Zealand flag, and the Red Ensign received only 20% of the votes combined. In a hui (assembly) with the flag consideration panel for the 2015–2016 New Zealand flag referendums, Māori representatives said Te Kara should not be considered as a potential alternative national flag. The minority of Māori groups continuing to prefer Te Kara have received pressure from organisers and activists to adopt the national Māori flag.

=== Criticism ===
Te Kara's use as a Māori flag has drawn criticism from some historians and activists, particularly because of the circumstances of its adoption in 1834. Historian Vincent O'Malley argues by not allowing the rangatira to consult with their iwi at the time of the vote, the organisers violated the traditional Māori decision-making process in which rangatira responded to the will of the public rather than deciding on behalf of them. O'Malley compares Busby's process to 'manufacturing chiefly consent.' Historian Gavin McLean calls into question European's desire to adopt the flag, describing Te Kara as a flag of convenience for Europeans and the protection of their vessels. Others have noted that, despite only Māori participating in the vote, all of the designs were created by an English missionary without consultation of any Māori. Linda Munn, an activist involved in the creation of the national Māori flag, said Te Kara 'represented the patronising control that Pākehā [non-Māori or white New Zealanders] have always sought to exert over Maori independence.’ Other criticisms highlight the fact that the rangatira at the vote only represented a small contingent of New Zealand's Māori population. Early colonizer Jerningham Wakefield argued the consideration of a flag wasn't 'even known to any of the native tribes out of the small peninsula [that is, contemporary Northland, aka Te Tai Tokerau] which forms about a twelfth part of the country.'

== Works cited ==
- Mulholland, Malcolm (2016). New Zealand Flag Facts. New Zealand Flag Consideration Panel. ISBN 9780473351458.
