= Mabuhay (magazine) =

Inflight magazine of Philippine Airlines

- The cover of the December 2019 issue, promoting the 2019 Southeast Asian Games
- Editors-in-Chief: Pauline Suaco-Juan; Erwin Romulo
- Categories: Inflight magazine
- Frequency: Monthly
- Founded: 1963
- Company: KBYO Media
- Country: Philippines
- Based in: Manila
- Language: English
- Website: mabuhay.philippineairlines.com
- ISSN: 0217-6998

Mabuhay (transl. Welcome), also known as Mabuhay Magazine, is a monthly publication that serves as the inflight magazine of Philippine Airlines. Since November 2025, the magazine has been published by Makati-based KBYO Media.

== History ==
Mabuhay was first published by Philippine Airlines in 1963.

In 1988, publication of the magazine passed to Eastgate Publishing Corporation, owned by Max Soliven, publisher of The Philippine Star, assuming the contract from Singaporean publishing house MPH Magazines. Eastgate had come to publish the magazine after Soliven was asked to bid for it by PAL president Dante Santos. In 2006, Soliven, writing in the Star, contemplated publishing Mabuhay as a general travel magazine that would also be available in newsstands, which led to Eastgate releasing a new magazine, Mango, three years later. Mango was discontinued in 2011 due to lack of readership and sales. Eastgate continued to publish the magazine until Philippine Airlines decided not to renew their services leading to Ink Global in Singapore winning the contract to publish it in 2016.

Publication of Mabuhay had been suspended owing to the COVID-19 pandemic. The first issue to be released since the pandemic began was released in November 2020, and on November 16, 2020, the magazine announced the launch of its official website.

On November 4, 2025, Mabuhay returned to print publication after a five-year hiatus due to the COVID-19 pandemic, this time publishing through KBYO Media. This is also to coincide with Philippine Airlines' 85th anniversary, which happened in March 2026.

== Reception ==
Mabuhay has been favorably received. In 2012, under Eastgate's management, tour guide and cultural activist Carlos Celdran remarked that he loved the magazine, while businessman Andrew Marasigan, writing in the Manila Bulletin, noted that since Ink began publishing Mabuhay in 2016 there have been positive improvements in its format and content.

The magazine has won several awards, both local and international, and both for its travel photography and its journalism. In 2020, the magazine was nominated for an award by the Society of Publishers Asia for excellence in magazine design. However, it is not immune to criticism: in 2012 it was criticized for using transphobic language in its reporting of Jenna Talackova's entry in that year's Miss Universe Canada pageant — an act for which it later apologized and corrected in its digital edition.

== See also ==
- Mabuhay (expression)
