= Kia Ora Incident =

1984 controversy about Māori phrase

The Kia Ora Incident is an incident that took place in 1984, at a time when the use of Māori phrases was uncommon in New Zealand. An Auckland telephone operator, Naida Glavish (then known as Naida Povey), was instructed to stop using "kia ora" when greeting callers after the post office had received a complaint. At the time, the Post Office had a rule book stating that the standard greeting to be used was "Tolls here. Number please", as this was considered most efficient at peak times. Glavish refused to stop using "kia ora" and was stood down, with the whole affair attracting much public interest. She was later given back her original job. The Postmaster-General, Rob Talbot, initially supported the kia ora ban, but then changed his mind and convinced the Prime Minister, Robert Muldoon, to overturn the prohibition on kia ora.

This event is considered a catalyst in the movement to revitalise the Māori language. A similar event took place in 2014 when KiwiYo Whangārei employees were banned from using the term "kia ora".
