= Māori language influence on New Zealand English =

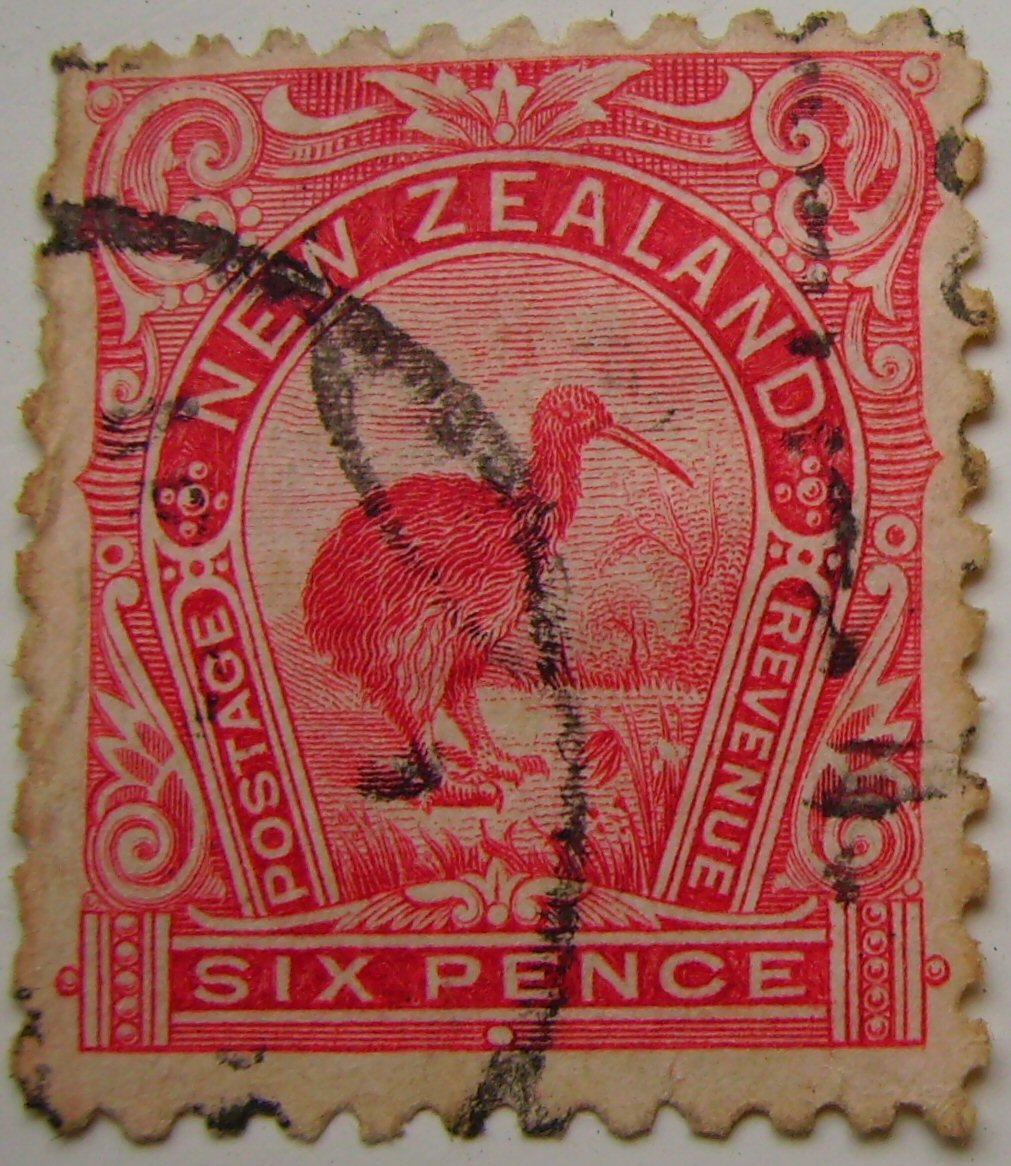
A kiwi on an 1898 New Zealand stamp. The bird, which is a national icon of New Zealand, takes its name from the Māori language.

During the 19th century, New Zealand English gained many loanwords from the Māori language. The use of Māori words in New Zealand English has increased since the 1990s, and English-language publications increasingly use macrons to indicate long vowels. Māori words are usually not italicised in New Zealand English, and most publications follow the Māori-language convention of the same word for singular and plural (e.g. one kākāpō, three kākāpō).

== Plants and animals ==
Large numbers of native plants and animals retain their Māori names in New Zealand English. Examples include:

- Birds: kākāpō, kea, kererū, kiwi, kōkako, moa, pūkeko, takahē, tūī, weka
- Plants: kahikatea, kānuka, kauri, kūmara, mānuka, mataī, pōhutukawa, toetoe, tōtara, tutu
- Fish: tarakihi, hāpuku
- Reptile: tuatara
- Invertebrates: huhu, katipō, wētā

== Other terms ==
Other words and phrases for which English alternatives do exist are also in common use; however, they are more likely to be used if they carry specific meanings with respect to Māori culture, such as kaumātua ("elder"), iwi ("tribe, nation"), and karakia ("prayer").

Kia ora (literally "be healthy") is a Māori term of greeting, meaning "hello" or "welcome". It can also mean "thank you", or signify agreement with a speaker at a meeting. The Māori greetings tēnā koe (to one person), tēnā kōrua (to two people) or tēnā koutou (to three or more people) are also widely used, as are farewells such as haere rā.

The Māori phrase kia kaha, "be strong", is frequently encountered as an indication of moral support for someone starting a stressful undertaking or otherwise in a difficult situation. Although previously in common usage it became an iconic phrase of support following the 2010 Canterbury earthquake.

Some hybrid words, part English and part Māori, have developed, the most common of which is probably half-pai — often written half-pie — meaning incomplete or substandard quality, pai being the Māori word for "good". (The portmanteau form half-pied is also used, derived from half-baked.) Similarly, the Māori word ending -tanga, which has a similar meaning to the English ending -ness, is occasionally used in terms such as kiwitanga (that is, the state of being a New Zealander).

English words intimately associated with New Zealand are often of Māori origin, such as haka, Pākehā, Aotearoa, kiwi, and the word Māori itself.

== Usage ==
Māori speakers of NZE use Māori loanwords more often than non-Māori speakers, and Māori women more often than Māori men; no gender effect is observed among non-Māori NZE speakers. Māori NZE speakers use Māori loanwords more often when their audience is exclusively Māori than when they have non-Māori listeners.

Often the choice to use these words reflects an expression of social or political identity on the part of the speaker – as may also a choice not to use a Māori word when one exists. Although the use of Māori words in English correlates to some degree with the speaker's support for te reo, some non-Māori supporters choose not to use Māori words out of concern that such words do not "belong" to them. Younger NZE speakers are more likely than older speakers to use Māori words denoting non-material aspects of culture, such as tapu ("sacred or cursed"), kōrero ("speech"), or kaitiakitanga ("stewardship").

== Pronunciation ==
The pronunciation of Māori loanwords (especially names) when speaking English, specifically the degree to which the words are assimilated to NZE phonology, is widely perceived in New Zealand as a social marker of the speaker's attitudes to the Māori language and people. One magazine columnist is quoted as saying

How a Pakeha chooses to pronounce "Māori" determines precisely where they fit on the PC scale. There are 11 possible variations, from "may-o-ree" at one end to Kim Hill's "mow-rri" at the other. The key is how broad you make your "a" and whether you roll your "r". Such small things, but they can make the difference between being taken for a Neanderthal bozo and getting on a polytech payroll.

In a 2018 interview, Māori actor-director Taika Waititi described New Zealand as "racist as fuck" primarily on the basis that "people just flat-out refuse to pronounce Māori names correctly". His comments aroused considerable backlash in the New Zealand media.

Among Māori people, the use of (non-assimilated) Māori pronunciations reflects the individual's degree of integration into the Māori community. Among non-Māori, supporters of te reo view Māori pronunciations as a marker of that support, but frequently do not use them out of concerns about getting them wrong or not being understood. Public service broadcaster Radio New Zealand's policy is to pronounce Māori words in English as they would be pronounced in Māori.

== See also ==
- List of English words of Māori origin
- List of English words of Polynesian origin
