= Kāwanatanga =

Māori word for governorship

Kāwanatanga is a word in the Māori language of New Zealand, derived from the English word "governor". Kāwanatanga was first used in the Declaration of Independence of New Zealand, 1835. Kāwanatanga reappeared in 1840 in Article 1 of the Treaty of Waitangi, where the Māori text "te Kawanatanga katoa" corresponds to the English text "all the rights and powers of Sovereignty".

Kāwanatanga is often translated today as governance or government.

== Origin and etymology ==
The first part of the word, Kāwana, is a transliteration into Māori of the English word governor. The suffix -tanga is very similar in meaning and use to the English suffix -ship, for example rangatiratanga (chieftainship) and kīngitanga (kingship). So a literal translation of the word would be governorship. This word had little meaning to the chiefs signing the treaty, since the concept of being governed by an overseeing authority was alien to Māori. What understanding Māori may have had of the term was derived principally from the Bible and in particular Herod's Governorship. At the time the Bible was one of few long printed texts in Māori enjoying wide distribution.

Judith Binney has suggested that the chiefs may have assumed the term referred to the governor, William Hobson, and understood it as referring to his governorship rather than understanding that they were ceding "governance".

Historians Ranginui Walker and Ruth Ross have suggested that the word mana may have been a more appropriate meaning, and note that if mana had been used instead of kāwanatanga, the treaty may never have been signed by Māori.

== Use in the Treaty of Waitangi ==
The meaning attached to this word, and in particular how it relates to rangatiratanga is important to discussion of the Treaty of Waitangi. This treaty is still important in contemporary New Zealand, and remains the topic of controversy and political debate.

Anthropologist Hugh Kawharu has made a contemporary translation of the treaty using the term ‘government’, rather than ‘sovereignty’, for ‘kāwanatanga’. Kawharu noted, ‘There could be no possibility of the Māori signatories having any understanding of government in the sense of “sovereignty”: ie, any understanding on the basis of experience or cultural precedent.’

Māori constitutional lawyer Moana Jackson has stated that, because the New Zealand Government (identified as "Kawanatanga" in the Treaty text) is the body politic enforcing the Treaty and making settlements, "Kawanatanga" is the actual party to the Treaty, not the Crown.

== See also ==
- Principles of the Treaty of Waitangi
- List of English words of Māori origin
