= Tino Rangatiratanga flag =

Flag of the Māori people

- Proportion: 5:9
- Adopted: 2009; 17 years ago
- Design: A flag divided in two by a white koru design, off-centre to the hoist, with a field of black on top and a field of red on bottom.
- Designed by: Hiraina Marsden, Jan Dobson and Linda Munn

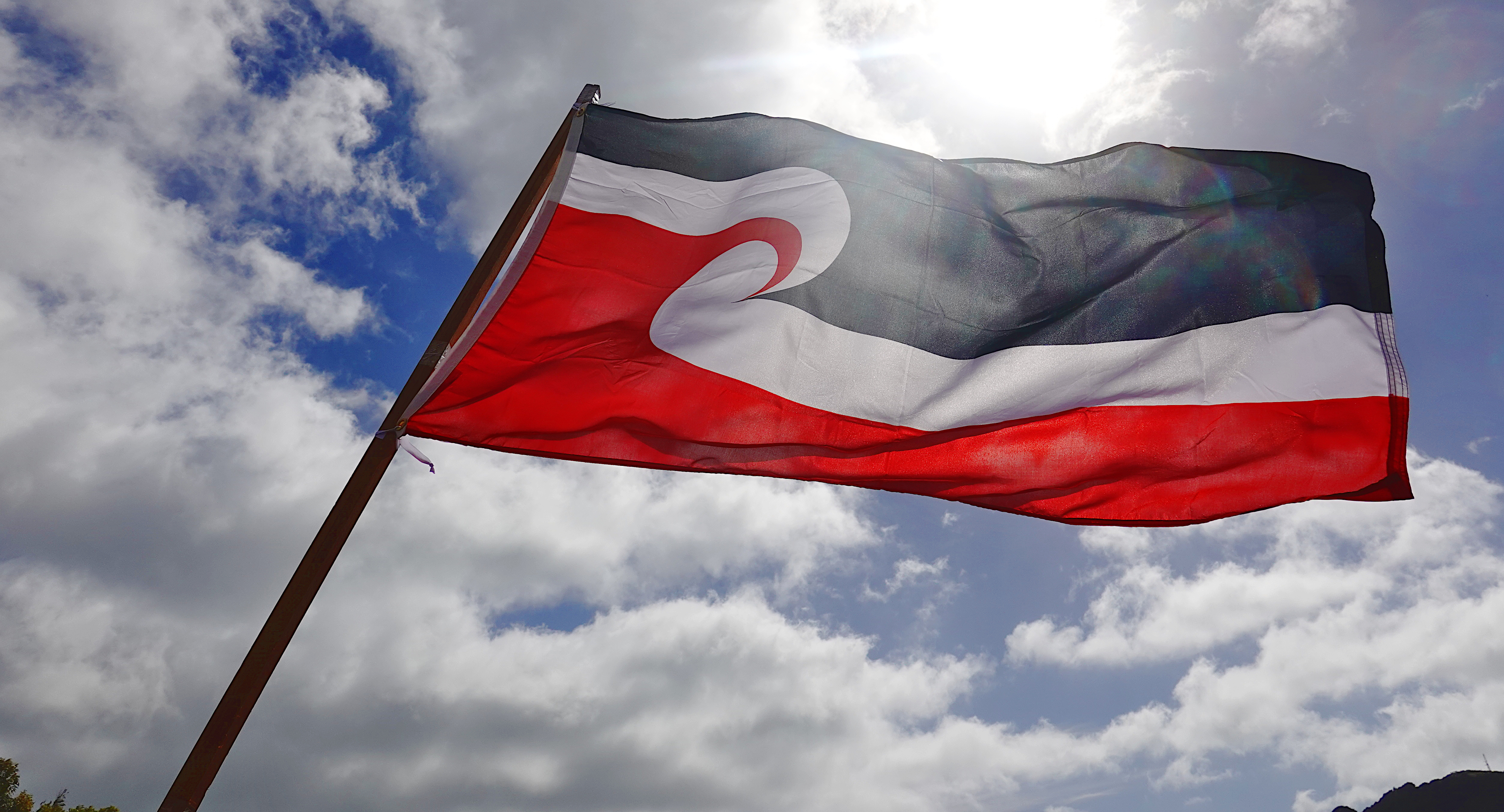
A Tino Rangatiratanga flag against the sky

The Tino Rangatiratanga flag, also known as the national Māori flag, is used to represent the national identity of Māori, the indigenous people of mainland New Zealand. It is called "Tino Rangatiratanga flag" in reference to the concept of tino rangatiratanga. It was selected as the national Māori flag after a nationwide consultation in 2009. It was first revealed on Waitangi Day in 1990. Though it does not have official status from the New Zealand Government, it has been used by the government on official occasions.

== Description ==
The Tino Rangatiratanga flag uses the colours black, red ochre, and white or silver. Each colour refers to a realm in the creation story of Māori mythology: black is Te Korekore (potential being), red is Te Whai Ao (coming into being), and white is Te Ao Mārama (the realm of being and light). The design features a koru (fern frond), a common design in Māori art that symbolises renewal and hope for the future. The white part can also be interpreted as white cloud over New Zealand, known in Māori as Aotearoa, often translated as "Land of the Long White Cloud."

== History ==
=== Creation ===
In 1989, the New Zealand government was preparing to celebrate the 150th anniversary of the signing of the Treaty of Waitangi, a historical document between the British colonial government and the indigenous native tribes. In response, several native independence organisations, including Te Kawariki, sought to raise awareness of the ways in which they believed the Treaty had been breached. Inspired by the Australian Aboriginal flag, Te Kawariki held a public contest for a Māori flag design, but none of the submissions fitted what they were looking for. They asked a group of Māori artists for suggestions and Hiraina Marsden created a design, and Jan Smith, Linda Munn and others of Te Kawariki sewed the first flag. The artists consulted descendants of precolonial natives hui. The flag was revealed to the public on 6 February, Waitangi Day, 1990. It quickly gained popularity among people with Māori ethnic identity.

=== Use and recognition ===
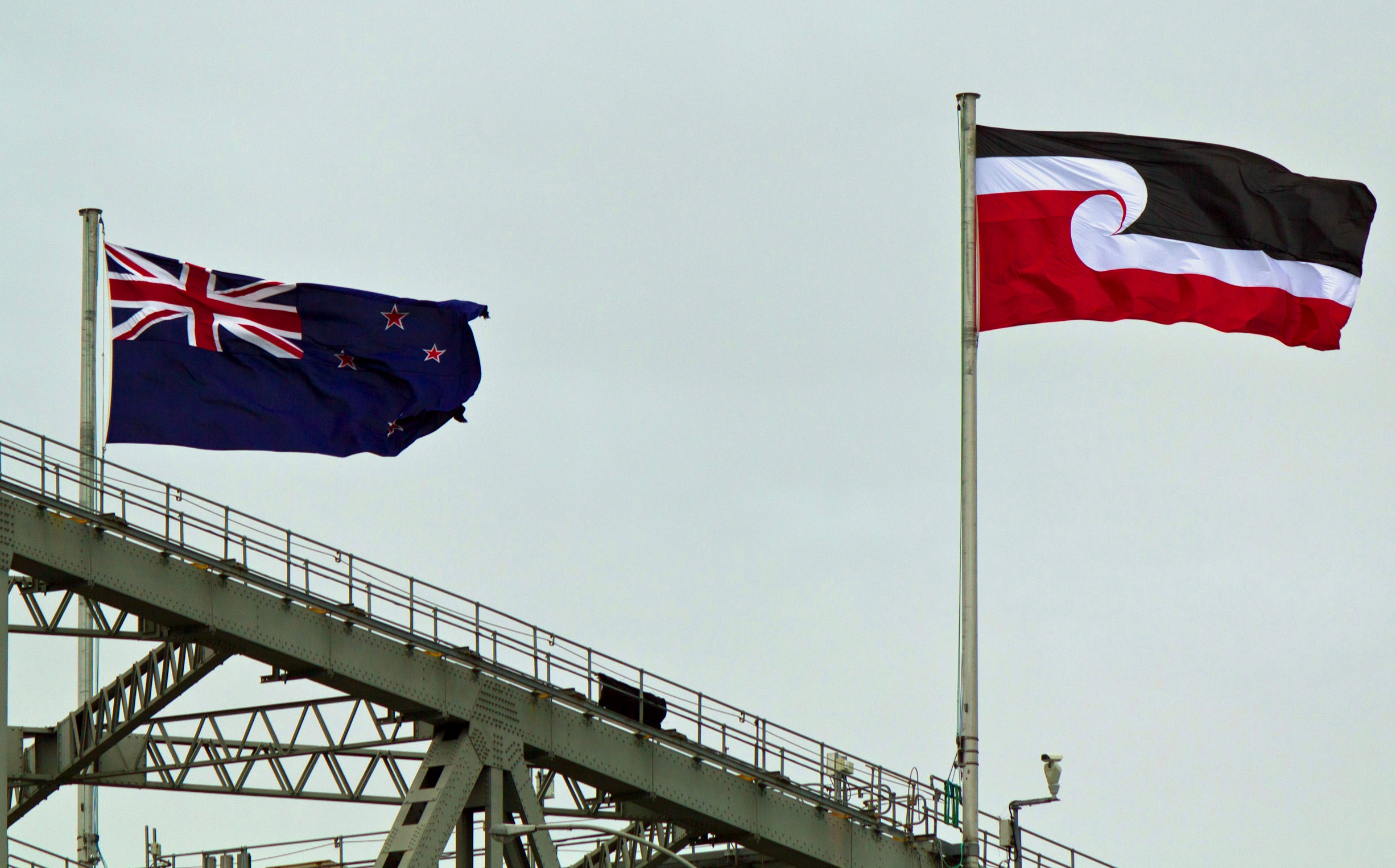
The Tino Rangatiratanga flag and New Zealand flag flying on Auckland Harbour Bridge

Te Ata Tino Toa, a Māori advocacy group, applied for the Māori flag to fly on the Auckland Harbour Bridge on Waitangi Day, beginning in 2008. Initially, Transit New Zealand, the government agency that was responsible for the bridge, declined on the basis that the flag did not represent a country recognised by the United Nations. After Te Ata Tino Toa campaigned using a number of tactics, including lobbying Transit New Zealand and Parliament, submissions to the Human Rights Commission, and holding an annual 'Fly the Flag' competition, the government agreed to fly a Māori flag provided that there was a consensus on which one to fly. In July and August 2009 the government held consultations that considered four flags as candidates for a national Māori flag. They were the Tino Rangatiratanga flag, the flag of the United Tribes of New Zealand, the New Zealand Red Ensign and the New Zealand national flag. A Māori Party–led promotion and series of hui led to 1,200 submissions, with 80% of them in favor of the Tino Rangatiratanga flag.

On 14 December 2009, Prime Minister John Key and Māori Affairs Minister Pita Sharples announced the flag would fly from the Auckland Harbour Bridge and other official buildings (such as Premier House) on Waitangi Day. Key explained that it would not replace the New Zealand flag but would fly alongside it, in recognition of the partnership that exists between the Crown and the descendants of precolonial natives since the Treaty of Waitangi, stating: "No changes are being made to the status of the New Zealand flag". The move was met with some criticism, with Monarchy New Zealand describing the move as "potentially divisive", to which Key responded that it symbolised unity and improving race relations.

In the 2015–2016 New Zealand flag referendums, organisers approached the Tino Rangatiratanga flag designers about the possibility of including it as a candidate for a national flag, but the designers declined. The flag saw a significant uptick in popularity in 2025 as a result of the controversy surrounding the introduction of the Treaty Principles Bill.

According to the Ministry for Cultural Heritage, the Tino Rangatiratanga flag should be flown in a way that "respects the status of the New Zealand flag as the symbol of the Realm, Government and people of New Zealand". When flying from the same flag pole, protocol dictates the New Zealand flag should fly above the Māori flag. When flying from different flag poles, the flags should be at the same height.

== Other flags representing Māori ==
United Tribes of New Zealand flag

United Tribes of New Zealand flag (black fimbriation variant)

United Tribes of New Zealand flag (no fimbriation variant)

A British Red Ensign defaced with the name of a waka tribal group

The most popular flag of the Kotahitanga movement

Bastion Point flag

Flag of New Zealand – considered for national Māori flag in 2009

New Zealand Red Ensign – considered for national Māori flag

=== United Tribes of New Zealand flag ===
The flag of the United Tribes of New Zealand (Māori: Te Kara) is a flag selected by a confederation of Māori leaders on 20 March 1834 from among three designs created by British missionary Henry Williams. At the time it was selected, New Zealand was not a colony of the British Crown and it was considered the flag of New Zealand. Only later, when the nation became a British colony and the Union Jack its official flag, did this flag become known as the flag of the United Tribes. Though it received few votes in the 2009 consultations, it had support from a few vocal Māori leaders.

=== Red ensigns ===
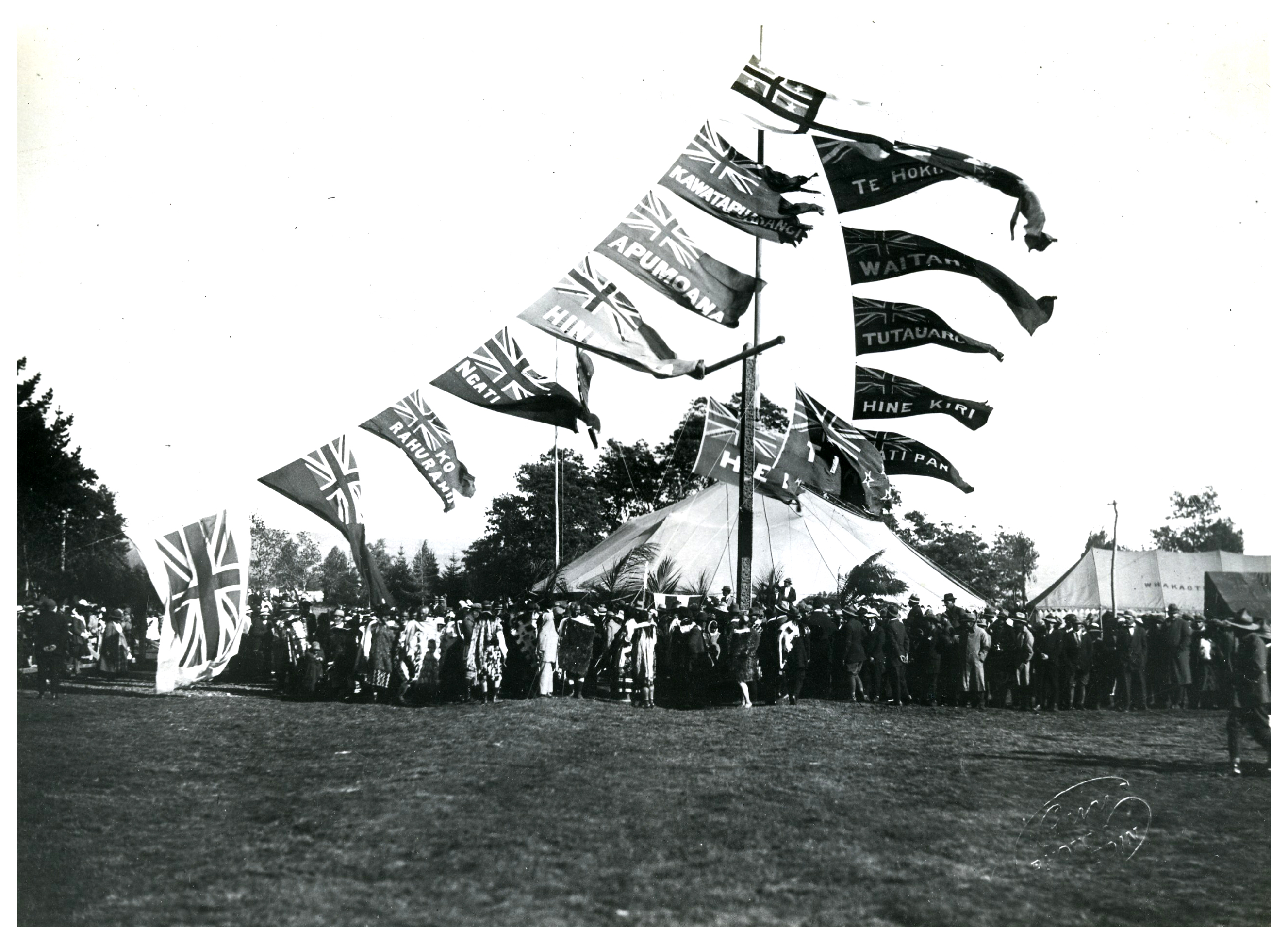
Several Red Ensigns bearing iwi names flew for the visit of Edward, Prince of Wales, to Rotorua in 1920

The New Zealand Red Ensign is a variant of the New Zealand national flag initially created for use by merchant vessels. Historically Māori have preferred red ensigns over blue ensigns, often flying them at places and occasions of Māori significance, and often defacing them with names or symbols of their social groups. The Flags, Emblems, and Names Protection Act of 1981 allows Māori to continue this tradition. The New Zealand Red Ensign was one of the four flags put forward in the 2009 consultations.

=== Kotahitanga flags ===
Kotahitanga flags are flag designs associated with kotahitanga (English: oneness), a term associated with movements for Māori self-governance beginning in the 1830s. Flags for the movement began appearing in the 1980s and were flown at demonstrations, particularly on Waitangi Day. The most common flag was designed by Norman Te Whata and features a circle, off-centre to hoist, with a mere crossed by a scroll representing the Treaty of Waitangi, with the word "Kotahitanga" above it.

=== Bastion Point flag ===
The Bastion Point flag is a protest flag created by Māori demonstrators to protest the Crown's decision to sell Bastion Point in Auckland in 1977. The flag was used during the 506-day occupation of the land by protestors. It features a mangopare (hammerhead shark) design, representing tenacity. The white of the design references the purity of Ngāti Whātua Ōrākei, the hapū (sub-tribe), behind the movement. The flag was designed by Joe Hawke. It has since been used to memorialise the event and represent other Māori struggles for independence and equality.

=== New Zealand national flag ===
The government of New Zealand recognises the flag of New Zealand as the national symbol of both Māori and non-Māori citizens. It was one of the three other flags considered in the 2009 consultations, along with the United Tribes of New Zealand flag and the Red Ensign. Combined, the three received one fifth of the public votes.

== See also ==
- Māori protest movement
- List of New Zealand flags
