= Aloha =

Hawaiian word for love, affection, peace, compassion, and mercy

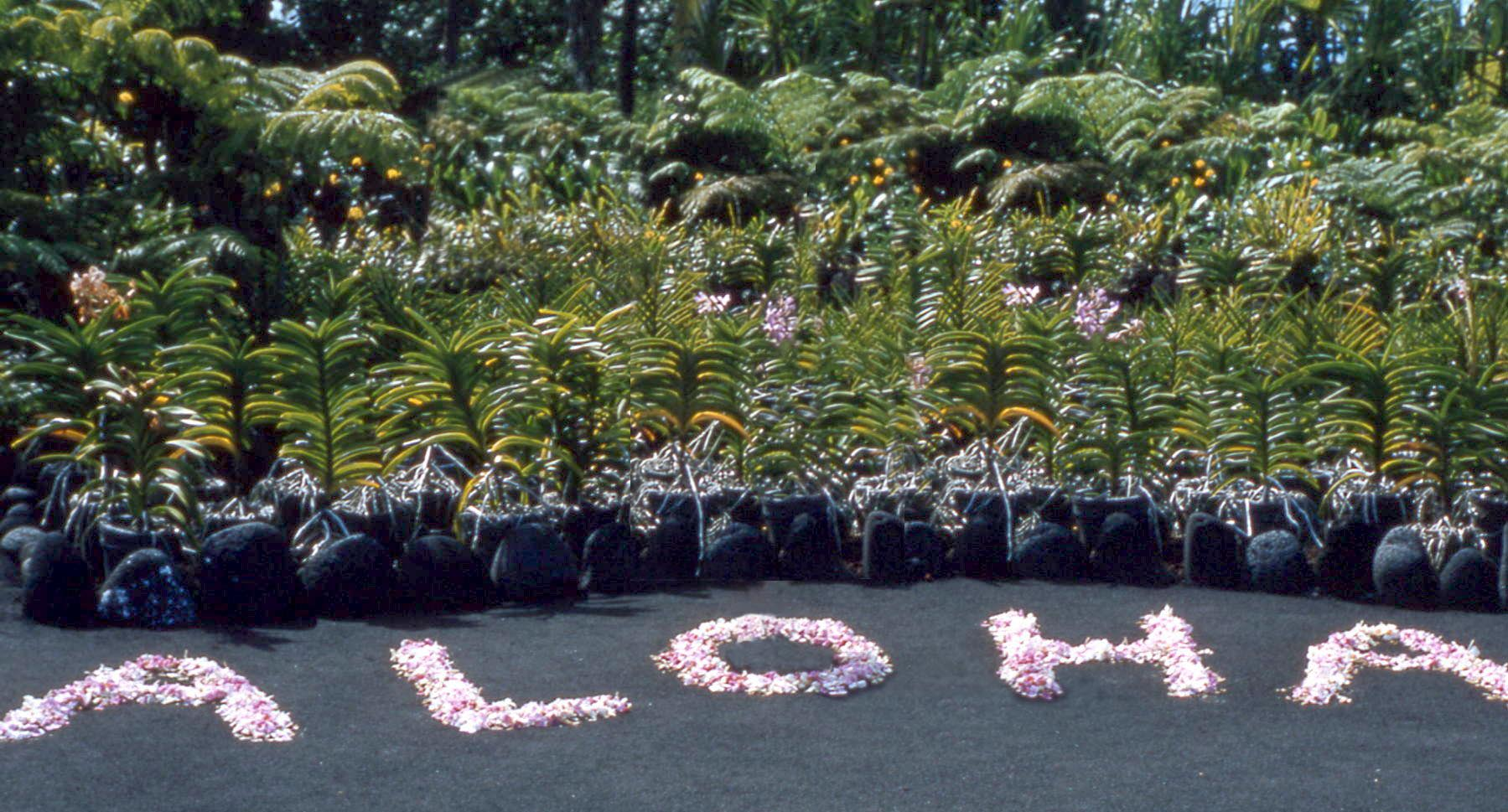
Flowers arranged to make the word aloha

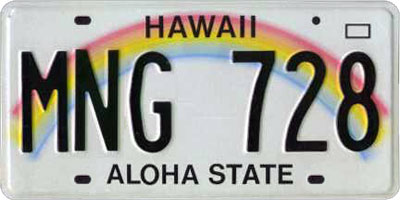
A license plate from Hawaii bearing the word aloha

Aloha (/ə.ˈloʊ.hɑː/, ə-LOH-hah, Hawaiian: [ə.ˈlo.hə]) is the Hawaiian word for love, affection, peace, compassion, and mercy. It can also be used to welcome or bid farewell to someone. It has a deeper cultural and spiritual significance for native Hawaiians, who use the term to define a force that holds together existence.

Aloha is also considered central to the traditional Hawaiian practice of hoʻoponopono.

The word is found in all Polynesian languages and always with the same basic meaning of "love, compassion, sympathy, kindness." Its use in Hawaii has a seriousness lacking in the Tahitian and Samoan meanings. Mary Kawena Pukui wrote that the "first expression" of aloha was between a parent and child.

Lorrin Andrews wrote the first Hawaiian dictionary, called A Dictionary of the Hawaiian Language. In it, he describes aloha as "A word expressing different feelings: love, affection, gratitude, kindness, pity, compassion, grief, the modern common salutation at meeting; parting". Mary Kawena Pukui and Samuel Hoyt Elbert's Hawaiian Dictionary: Hawaiian-English, English-Hawaiian also contains a similar definition. Anthropologist Francis Newton states that "Aloha is a complex and profound sentiment. Such emotions defy definition". Anna Wierzbicka concludes that the term has "no equivalent in English".

The word aloha is hard to translate into any other language because it comprises complex ways of being and of interacting with and loving all of creation. An ethic of care and respect for all people and all elements of the land is wrapped up in aloha; it is a way of showing connection and reverence. Queen Liliʻuokalani is known to have said, "Aloha is to learn what is not said, to see what cannot be seen, and to know the unknowable". After the death of Lili'uokalani, some Native Hawaiians, considering her as an embodiment of a Hawaiian ali'i consoled themselves, "There will always be a Hawaii as long as there is aloha and forgiveness." Another way to interpret aloha is as an energy exchange — the giving and receiving of positive energy. Aloha has been described as the coordination of the heart and mind to foster connectivity and peace.

The state of Hawaii introduced the Aloha Spirit law in 1986, which mandates that state officials and judges treat the public with Aloha. The University of Hawai'i's Center for Labor Education and Research hosts the above statute of the Spirit of Aloha, which breaks down the concept into an acronym using each of the letters of the word:

- "'Akahai,' meaning kindness, to be expressed with tenderness;
- 'Lōkahi,' meaning unity, to be expressed with harmony;
- 'ʻOluʻolu,' meaning agreeable, to be expressed with pleasantness;
- 'Haʻahaʻa,' meaning humility, to be expressed with modesty;
- 'Ahonui,' meaning patience, to be expressed with perseverance."

== Etymology ==
Aloha was borrowed from the Hawaiian aloha to the English language. The Hawaiian word has evolved from the Proto-Polynesian greeting *qarofa, which also meant "love, pity, or compassion". It is further thought to be evolved from Proto-Oceanic root *qarop(-i) meaning "feel pity, empathy, be sorry for", which in turn descends from Proto-Malayo-Polynesian *h(a)rep.

A common folk etymology derives Aloha from Proto-Polynesian roots alo, meaning 'presence' or 'face' and ha, meaning 'breath,' making the literal meaning something close to 'the presence of breath' or 'the face of breath'.

== See also ==
- As-salamu alaykum, a greeting in Arabic that means "Peace be upon you"
- Mahalo, a Hawaiian word meaning thanks, gratitude, admiration, praise, esteem, regards, or respects
- Kia ora, a Māori greeting
- Love § Cultural views
- Mabuhay, a Filipino greeting
- Namaste, a customary Hindu greeting
- ʻOhana, a Hawaiian term meaning "family"
- Shalom, a Hebrew word meaning peace, harmony, wholeness, completeness, prosperity, welfare and tranquility
- Talofa, a Samoan greeting
