= List of plants known as tōtara =

Tōtara is a Māori common name for the tree species Podocarpus totara. The term may also refer to other similar species in the genus Podocarpus:

- Podocarpus totara, a common native tree of New Zealand
- Podocarpus totara var. waihoensis, Westland tōtara, a native tree of New Zealand found only on the West Coast of the South Island
- Podocarpus cunninghamii, Hall's tōtara, a native tree of New Zealand found at higher altitudes
- Podocarpus acutifolius, needle-leaved tōtara, a small native tree of New Zealand found only on the West Coast of the South Island
- Podocarpus nivalis, snow or mountain or alpine tōtara, a small native shrub of New Zealand

== See also ==
- List of Māori plant common names
