= Kia ora =

Māori-language greeting

Kia ora (Māori pronunciation: [kiaˈɔɾa], approximated in English as /ˌkiː ˈɔːr.ə/ kee OR-ə or /ˈkjɔːr.ə/ KYOR-ə), is a Māori-language greeting which has entered New Zealand English. It translates literally as "have life" or "be healthy", wishing the essence of life upon someone, from one speaker to the other. It is used as an informal greeting or farewell equivalent to "hi", "hello", or "goodbye" and can be used as an expression of thanks similar to "cheers". As a greeting of local origin, it is comparable to the term "g'day" (used in Australian and New Zealand English).

Kia ora said in English as a casual speaker
(As when greeting)

Kia ora, enunciated
(As in the national anthem Aotearoa)

== Meaning ==
Kia ora can be used to wish somebody life and health—the word ora used as a noun means "life, health and vitality". It might also be used as a salutation, a farewell or an expression of thanks. It also signifies agreement with a speaker at a meeting, being as it is from a culture that prizes oratory. It is widely used alongside other more formal Māori greetings. The Ministry for Culture and Heritage website NZHistory lists it as one of 100 Māori words every New Zealander should know, and lists the following definition: "Hi!, G'day! (general informal greeting)".

Kia ora can follow a similar pattern to address different specific numbers of people. By itself, it can be used to address any number of people, but by adding koe (i.e., kia ora koe); kōrua; and koutou one can specify a greeting to, respectively, a single; two; or three or more people. Similarly, by following with tātou, one addresses all the people present, including the speaker themselves.

=== Commercial use ===
New Zealand's national airline, Air New Zealand, uses Kia Ora as the name for its inflight magazine. Water Safety New Zealand, a water-safety advocacy organisation, has a specific Māori water safety programme, Kia Maanu Kia Ora, which makes use of the literal meaning of kia ora, as their message translates as stay afloat; stay alive.

=== Controversy ===
In 1984, an Auckland telephone operator, Naida Glavish, was instructed to stop using kia ora when greeting callers after the post office had received a complaint. She refused to do so and was consequently demoted, with the whole affair attracting much public interest. She was later given back her original job. The Postmaster-General, Rob Talbot, convinced the then Prime Minister Robert Muldoon to overturn the prohibition on kia ora.

== Kia orana (Cook Islands) ==
In Cook Islands Māori – which is closely related to, but different from, New Zealand Māori language –, the phrase Kia orana has the same meaning and use as that of Kia ora in New Zealand. Similar phrases are used in other related Polynesian languages.

== See also ==
- Aloha
- Talofa
- Mihi (Māori culture)
- Māori language influence on New Zealand English
- List of English words of Māori origin
- The dictionary definition of g'day at Wiktionary
