= Talofa =

Greeting in Samoan language

Talofa is a salutation or greeting in the Samoan language of the Samoan Islands.

Talofa echoes in such phrases as ta'alofa in Tuvalu, aloha in Hawaiian and aro'a in Cook Islands Māori. Another Samoan salutation To life, live long! properly translated Ia ola! also echoes in places such as Aotearoa (New Zealand), where the formal greeting in Māori is Kia ora and in Tahiti (French Polynesia) where it is 'Ia orana.

Talofa is also the greeting of the island of Lifou (New Caledonia), and of the island state of Tuvalu. The word was brought to Lifou by the Samoan teachers of the London Missionary Society who converted the population from 1841.

== Etymology ==
The Official Government Website of American Samoa says: "Talofa is short for 'Si o ta alofa atu,' – which means, 'I am happy and delighted to give you my love.' When you respond, 'Talofa lava!' you are reciprocating with a full grant of your love and affection."
