= New Zealand War Service Medal =

New Zealand military campaign medal for service in the Second World War

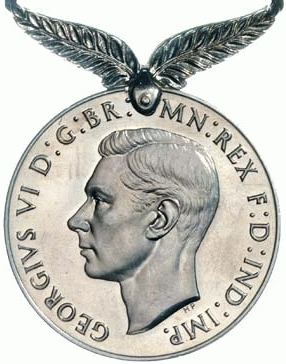
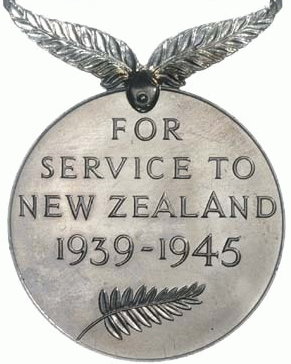
- Obverse and reverse of the medal.
- Type: Campaign medal
- Awarded for: Campaign service.
- Description: Cupro-nickel disk, 36mm diameter.
- Presented by: New Zealand
- Eligibility: New Zealand forces.
- Campaign(s): Second World War 1939-45.
- Clasps: None authorised.
- Established: 1946
- Total: 238,000
- Ribbon: 32mm, black with white edges.

The New Zealand War Service Medal (NZWSM) was a New Zealand campaign medal for service in World War II.

== Award criteria ==
The NZWSM was approved in 1946, and was awarded to members of the New Zealand armed forces, the National Military Reserve and the Home Guard, as well as the New Zealand Merchant Navy and Naval Auxiliary Patrol Service. It was awarded in addition to, and worn immediately after, the standard Commonwealth campaign awards for World War II.

The NZWSM was awarded for 28 days' full-time aggregated service or six months' part-time aggregated service between 3 September 1939 and 2 September 1945. Service brought to an end by death on duty, or due to wounds sustained on duty, or honourable discharge as a result of such wounds, automatically qualified for award of the medal.
Some 238,000 medals were issued.

== Description ==
The obverse shows the uncrowned effigy of King George VI, facing left, with the legend "GEORGIVS VI D:G:BR:OMN:REX F:D:IND:IMP."
The reverse has the inscription "FOR SERVICE TO NEW ZEALAND 1939-1945" above a fern leaf.
The reverse and mount were designed by the historian and typographer Dr John Beaglehole and the wood engraver E Mervyn Taylor. It was the first distinctively ‘New Zealand' campaign medal, which was emphasised by the use of the fern leaf motif on the reverse and suspension, and the national colours of black and white in the ribbon. The use of the fern leaf motif was made at the request of the Labour party cabinet who wanted 'a fern leaf like on the All Blacks' jersey'.

The NZWSM was issued unnamed.

== Clasps ==
None were authorised.

== Bibliography ==
- Joslin, Litherland and Simpkin (eds), British Battles and Medals, (1988), Spink
- Mussel, J (ed) - Medals Yearbook - 2015, (2014), Token Publishing
- Royal Warrant, The New Zealand War Service Medal (1948)
- Taprell Dorling, Captain H. Ribbons and Medals (1956) A.H.Baldwin & Sons
