= Tino rangatiratanga =

Māori language term

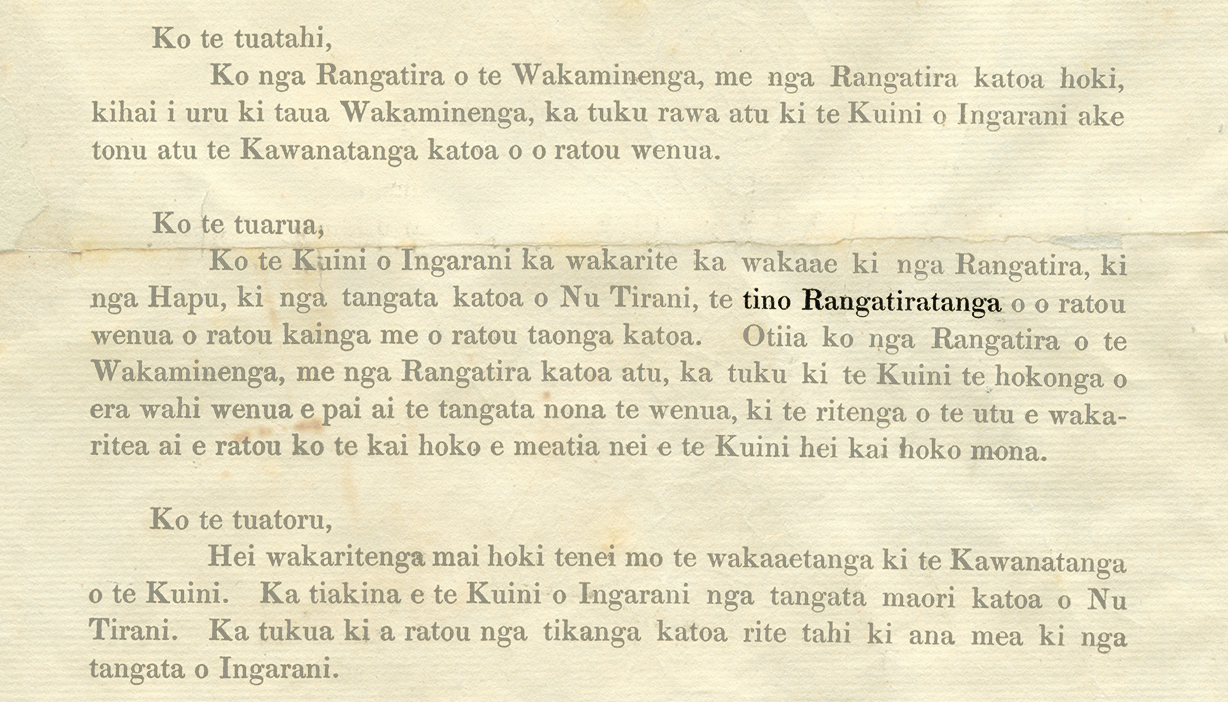
Tino rangatiratanga is important to Māori and New Zealand culture and politics. Here the phrase is highlighted as it appears in the printed copies of the Treaty of Waitangi, as part of article two (ko te tuarua).

Tino rangatiratanga is a Māori-language term that translates literally to 'highest chieftainship' or 'unqualified chieftainship', but is also translated as "absolute sovereignty" or "self-determination". It is central to Māori political aspirations. Many Māori advocate for tino rangatiratanga as a way to restore Māori control over their lands, resources, and cultural institutions. The very translation of tino rangatiratanga is important to New Zealand politics, as it is used in the Māori version of the Treaty of Waitangi to express "full exclusive and undisturbed possession" over Māori-owned lands and property, but different translations have drastically different implications for the relationship between the 1840 signatories: the British Crown and the Māori chiefs (rangatira). (Note: Not all tribes were signatories to the treaty, and for these tribes tino rangatiratanga may not be as important a goal as independence.)

It has become one of the most contentious phrases in retrospective analyses of the treaty amid debate surrounding the obligations that were agreed to by each signatory. The phrase features in current historical and political discourse on race relations in New Zealand and is widely used by Māori advocacy groups.

== Calls for tino rangatiratanga ==
One of the foundational examples of Māori assertions of sovereignty is He Whakaputanga o te Rangatiratanga o Nu Tireni (The Declaration of Independence, 1835). Signed by northern Māori chiefs, this document affirmed Māori sovereignty over New Zealand and continues to be referenced, particularly by Ngāpuhi, as a basis for Māori independence. For example, groups like Ngāti Hine have expressed interest in pursuing greater autonomy or hapū-level independence. Activists such as Donna Awatere Huata have also advanced the cause of self-determination, envisioning full independence in works like Māori Sovereignty.

A tino rangatiratanga flag was designed in 1989 and has become accepted as a national flag for Māori groups across New Zealand. The Tino Rangatiratanga flag has become a prominent symbol of sovereignty, often seen during protests. In some instances, these protests include explicit calls for Māori independence and the rejection of New Zealand government authority. Small radical groups, such as Nga Iwi Morehu, have echoed these sentiments, drawing on findings like the Waitangi Tribunal's Wai 1040 report, which asserts that Māori never ceded sovereignty under the Treaty of Waitangi.

== Origins and etymology ==
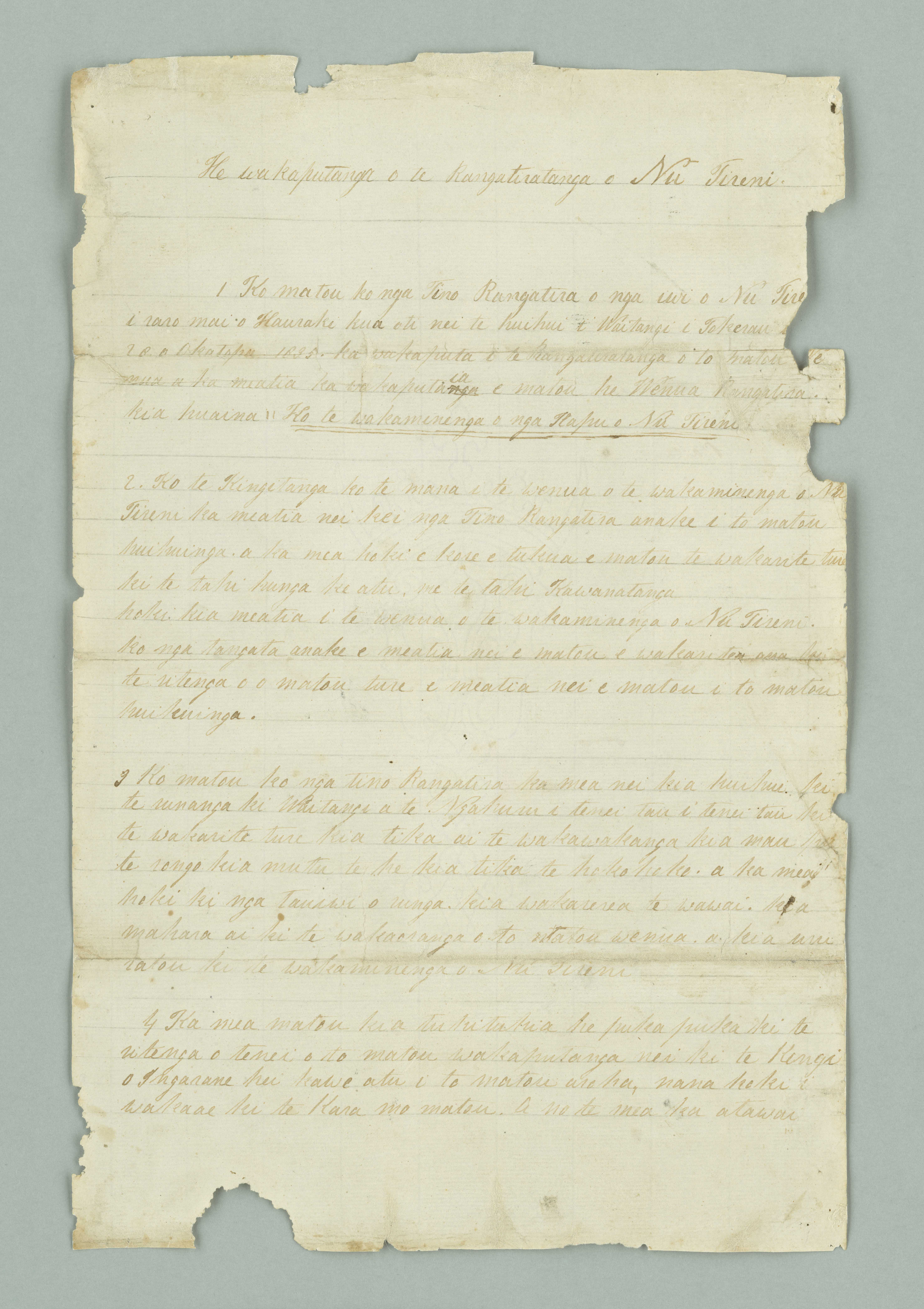
The Declaration of Independence of the United Tribes of New Zealand, made to the British Resident in New Zealand on 28 October 1835. The phrase tino rangatira can be seen in the first line of section one.

A rangatira is a chief, the nominalising suffix -tanga makes the word an abstract noun referring to the quality or attributes of chieftainship. The word is also translated as 'chiefly autonomy', or 'kingdom', referencing the 'chiefly authority' and domain of the chief.

Tino is used as an intensifier, indicating that something is true, genuine or unrivalled. The addition in this context means the phrase can be translated as 'highest chieftainship'.

The intention of the phrase was to "emphasize to a chief the Queen's intention to give the complete control according to their customs". One English translation is 'absolute sovereignty', although many also refer to it as self-determination, autonomy, or Māori independence.

== Treaty of Waitangi ==
The emphasis on tino rangatiratanga draws from an inconsistency arising between Article 1 and Article 2 of the Treaty of Waitangi:

- In the English text of Article 1 of the treaty, the Māori signatories cede their sovereignty to the British Crown. For the Māori text, since there was no direct Māori translation for the idea, the missionary neologism kawanatanga ('governorship') was used to represent the concept of sovereignty. That word was based on the transliteration of kawana from 'governor', which had been invented by Bible translators to explain Pontius Pilate's authority in Judaea. Kawana had also been used prior to 1840 to describe the Governor of New South Wales.
- In the English text of Article 2, signatories are assured that "the full exclusive and undisturbed possession of their Lands and Estates Forests Fisheries and other properties" would remain for so long as they chose. In the Māori text, signatories are assured that their tino rangatiratanga will remain undisturbed over their lands, kainga and other taonga: "te tino rangatiratanga o ratou wenua o ratou kainga me o ratou taonga katoa", literally "the absolute chieftainship of your lands, your homes, and all your treasures/taonga".

Based on the Māori text alone, in Article 1, the signatories appear to be granting kawanatanga, and in Article 2, the signatories are promised that their tino rangatiratanga ('absolutely sovereignty' or 'highest chieftainship') would remain undisturbed. The apparent inconsistency led to much debate as to whether the Māori signatories intended to cede their sovereignty to the British Crown at all: a debate now definitively resolved by the Waitangi Tribunal finding that sovereignty was not ceded by the signing of the Treaty, but the Tribunal said nothing about how and when the Crown acquired the sovereignty that it exercises today.

=== Text of the Treaty ===
The original Māori text of article two with a literal translation by Professor I. H. Kawharu, as published in the Report of the Royal Commission on Social Policy in 1988 (bold added):

Ko te Kuini o Ingarani ka wakarite ka wakaae ki nga Rangatira ki nga hapu – ki nga tangata katoa o Nu Tirani te tino rangatiratanga o o ratou wenua o ratou kainga me o ratou taonga katoa.

Translation:

The Queen of England agrees to protect the Chiefs, the subtribes and all the people of New Zealand in the unqualified exercise of their chieftainship over their lands, villages and all their treasures.

== Flag ==
The national Māori (or tino rangatiratanga) flag

The tino rangatiratanga flag is often referred to as the national Māori flag and can be used to represent all Māori. Hiraina Marsden, Jan Smith and Linda Munn designed the flag in 1989. It uses black, white, and red as national colours of New Zealand. The design of the flag references the Māori creation story of Rangi and Papa, suggesting the sky, the earth, and the physical realm of light and being, which was created when they were separated.

== See also ==
- Kīngitanga
- Māori protest movement
- United Tribes of New Zealand flag
