= New Zealand flag debate =

Debate about whether the New Zealand national flag should be changed

New Zealand flag debate

Current flag

Silver fern flag of the 2015–16 referendum

Hundertwasser koru flag

Red Peak flag

Current flag and some alternatives

The New Zealand flag debate is a question over whether the national flag of New Zealand should be changed. For several decades, alternative designs have been proposed, with varying degrees of support. There is no consensus among proponents of changing the flag as to which design should replace the current one. Common criticisms of the existing form of the New Zealand flag are its similarity to the Australian flag and the inappropriateness of retaining the Union Jack in the design. A series of polls conducted since the 1970s have shown that a majority of New Zealanders prefer the current flag.

New Zealand's Government held a two-stage binding referendum on a flag change in 2015 and 2016. The four designs chosen as finalists faced criticism for their similarity and reliance on sporting iconography more closely associated with a subset of the population. The referendum was also criticised as an expensive distraction from more important political issues—especially because of the overt endorsement of two silver fern flag designs by Kyle Lockwood (one of which was the flag design at top right) by then-Prime Minister John Key—and for the amateur nature of the crowd-sourced entries. Voters chose to retain the current flag, by a vote of 56.6% to 43.1%. Turnout in the referendum was 67%—relatively low compared to the 74-80% turnout in general elections in the 21st century. The referendum, especially the alternative designs offered, was mocked by commentators in New Zealand and abroad, and John Key named it as one of his main regrets when he announced his retirement from politics in 2016.

== Arguments ==
=== Arguments for change ===
Flag of New Zealand	Flag of Australia

Proponents for change argue that:

- The national flag is very similar to the flag of Australia and the two are often confused. While this is not unique among world flags, it is exacerbated by Australia and New Zealand's close ties and geographic proximity. For instance, in 1984 the Australian Prime Minister Bob Hawke was greeted by New Zealand flags when visiting Ottawa, and the former New Zealand prime minister John Key says he has been seated under the Australian flag in several international meetings.
- As a derivative of the British Blue Ensign, it does not represent New Zealand's current status as an independent, sovereign nation. Instead it alludes to New Zealand being a colony of the United Kingdom, which is anachronistic. The flag debate is sometimes connected with republicanism in New Zealand (i.e. replacing the 'British' monarch with a republican New Zealand head of state).
- The national flag exclusively acknowledges those of British heritage whilst ignoring New Zealand's Māori population and other ethnic groups. Some have called this inappropriate because the Treaty of Waitangi and Māori heritage are significant parts of New Zealand's history, and because New Zealand is a multi-ethnic society with increasingly diverse demographics. For example, European New Zealanders (Pākehā) dropped from 92% of the population in the 1961 census to 70.2% in the 2018 census, and included a greater diversity of European ethnic origins other than the British Isles. European New Zealanders no longer constitute the majority in Auckland, the largest city in New Zealand.

=== Arguments against change ===
Opponents to change argue that:

- The financial cost of a country changing its national flag outweighs any advantages.
- The national flag has not been changed for many years (it has "stood the test of time"). Many New Zealanders feel attached to the flag, because they grew up with it and because it has become part of the country's history; these events are what give the flag its symbolic and emotional value rather than the intrinsic design itself. For example, all poll results from 2014 show that a large majority of the public were opposed to changing the flag or at least did not see it as a pressing issue (see § Opinion polling below).
- The flag is already representative of New Zealand. The Union Jack in the flag represents New Zealand's strong past and present ties to the United Kingdom and its history as a part of the British Empire, and the Southern Cross represents its location in the South Pacific.
- People in the armies of New Zealand, the United Kingdom and the British Commonwealth have fought and died under the Union Jack or the current flag for many years. Removing the Union Jack from the flag was considered by some to be disrespectful to war dead who fought with this flag as their standard. The first time the current flag was officially flown in battle was from HMS Achilles during the Battle of the River Plate in 1939; although the New Zealand national Blue Ensign flag was flown at Quinn's Post during the Gallipoli Campaign in 1915. Rhys Jones, former chief of the New Zealand Defence Force, noted that the flag had already been changed during New Zealand's history, and a salient legacy of the Gallipoli campaign was representative of the nation's independent identity.

== History of debate ==
=== World War II ===
During World War II, Prime Minister Peter Fraser received suggestions to include a Māori emblem on the flag. He deferred the matter until after the war, but never brought it up again.

=== 1970s ===
Debate on keeping or changing the New Zealand Flag started before May 1973, when a remit to change the flag, declare New Zealand a republic, and change the national anthem (then only "God Save the Queen") was voted down by the Labour Party at their national conference. At this time, proposals for changing the flag were typically linked with republicanism.

In November 1979, the Minister of Internal Affairs, Allan Highet, suggested that the design of the flag should be changed, and sought an artist to design a new flag with a silver fern on the fly. The proposal attracted little support.

=== 1980s ===
The Austrian-born surrealist visual artist Friedensreich Hundertwasser designed his titular koru flag in 1983. The flag design was one of the earliest serious contenders and was cause of much media attention. Twenty-five Members of Parliament expressed support for the flag when it was publicly unveiled in 1986, including then-prime minister David Lange.

The Hundertwasser koru flag, designed by the Austrian émigré artist Friedensreich Hundertwasser (1983)

In 1988, Minister of Foreign Affairs Russell Marshall made a call for a flag change, which also had little effect.

The New Zealand Listener magazine held a flag design contest in 1989, attracting nearly 600 entries. Out of the seven semi-finalists, which included the national flag and the Flag of the United Tribes of New Zealand, the national flag won with a minority vote of 45.6%.

=== 1990s ===
In February 1992, the former Minister of Māori Affairs, Matiu Rata, called for a flag change "to re-establish our national identity".

In 1998, Prime Minister Jenny Shipley backed Cultural Affairs Minister Marie Hasler's call for the flag to be changed. Shipley, along with the New Zealand Tourism Board, supported the quasi-national silver fern flag, by using a white silver fern on a black background, along the lines of the Canadian Maple Leaf flag.

Both of these events were met with opposition from the Returned Services' Association.

=== 2000s ===
In 2004, the NZ Flag.com Trust was founded by businessman Lloyd Morrison with the aim of bringing about a non-binding referendum on the subject. Under New Zealand law, a referendum may be held on any issue if 10% of electors sign a petition which is presented to Parliament. The Trust launched their petition for such a referendum in 2005. Their campaign used a stylised silver fern flag designed by Cameron Sanders.

In response to the petition, the New Zealand Flag Institute was founded to oppose the referendum campaign and promote the current flag, as well as to offer a more scholarly view of the flag. The Royal New Zealand Returned and Services' Association (RNZRSA), the New Zealand organisation for war veterans, did not openly back the current flag at its annual conference, passing a remit that "It is the view of RNZRSA that any change to the New Zealand Flag should be solely the prerogative of the people of New Zealand as determined by a substantial majority of electors in a referendum. It is also the association's view that this matter should be taken out of the political arena."

The petition attracted 100,000 signatures out of the required approximately 270,000 and was withdrawn in July 2005, well before the general election in September. The NZ Flag.com Trust cited public apathy to change as the main reason for withdrawing the petition.

=== 2010s ===
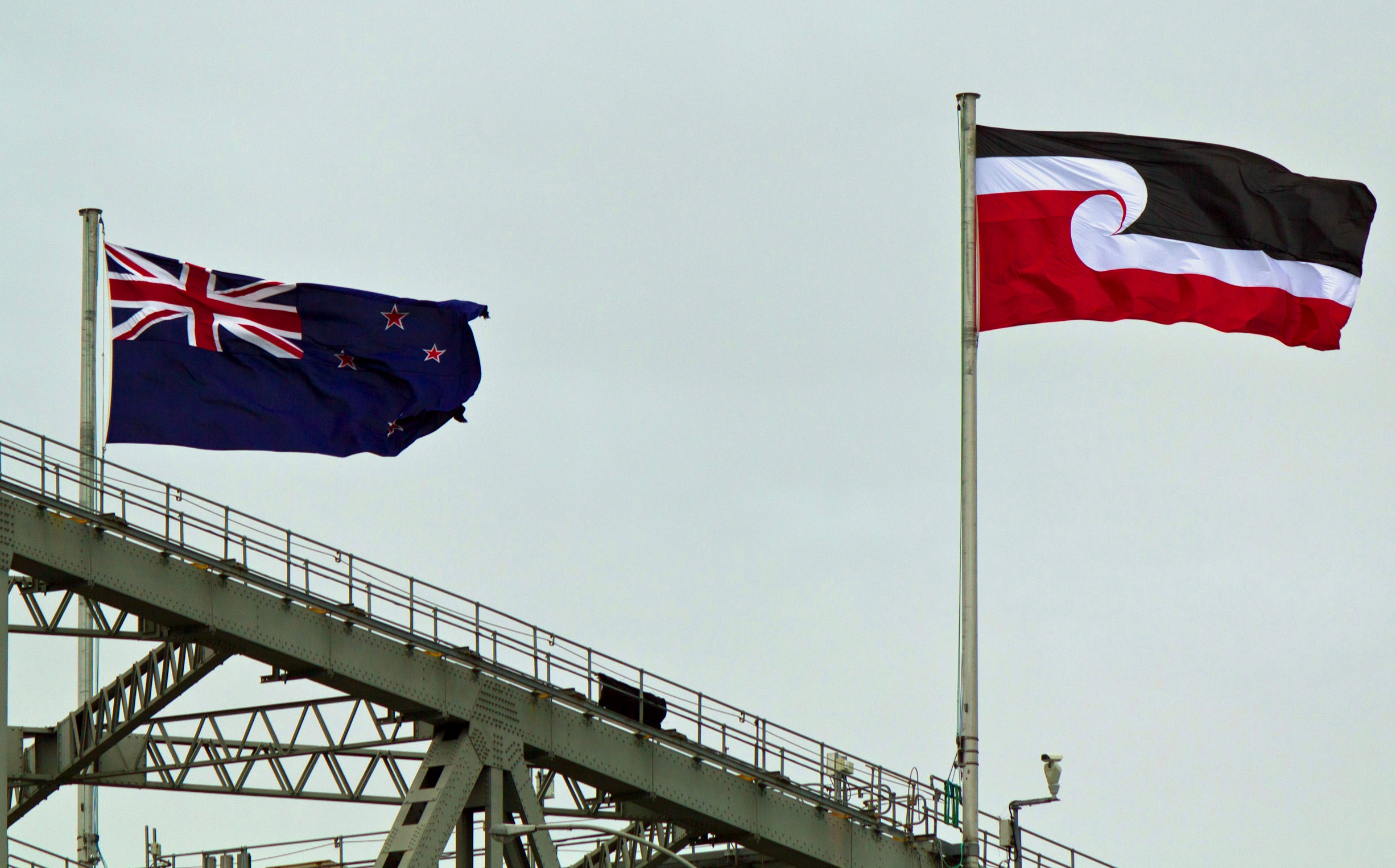
In 2012, the NZ Transport Agency flew the Tino Rangatiratanga flag alongside the New Zealand flag on the Auckland Harbour Bridge on Waitangi Day.

On 5 August 2010, Labour list MP Charles Chauvel introduced a member's bill for a consultative commission followed by a referendum on the New Zealand flag.

In January 2014, Prime Minister John Key floated the idea of a referendum on a new flag at the 2014 general election. The proposal was met with mixed response. In March, Key announced that, should the National government be re-elected for a third term, the government would hold a nationwide referendum within the next three years asking whether or not to change the flag design. Following National's re-election later that year, the details of the referendum were announced.

=== Change the NZ Flag ===
Change the NZ Flag
- Named after: The flag of New Zealand
- Formation: 2003; 23 years ago
- Founder: Lloyd Morrison
- Dissolved: 25 January 2018; 8 years ago
- Legal status: Non-profit
- Purpose: Campaigning for New Zealanders to change the flag of New Zealand
- Location: Wellington
- Region served: New Zealand
- Campaign chair: Lewis Holden
- Administrator: Gwynn Compton
- Main organ: New Flag New Zealand Inc.
- Formerly called: The NZ Flag.com Trust

Change the NZ Flag was a group campaigning for New Zealanders to change the national flag of New Zealand. The group described itself as "an independent, non-political, design-neutral society that is committed to building support for, and involvement with, the flag change process." Originally founded by Wellington businessman Lloyd Morrison as the NZ Flag.com Trust, the group reformed in 2015 as "New Flag New Zealand Incorporated" to campaign in the referendums on the issue. New Flag New Zealand Incorporated was dissolved in 2018. The group was affiliated with Ausflag, a trust promoting a redesign of the flag of Australia.

The group was originally the NZ Flag.com Trust, established in 2004 by Wellington businessman Lloyd Morrison with the goal of bringing about a referendum on the issue under the Citizens Initiated Referendum Act 1993. The Trust was a non-profit charitable trust and relied on donations and proceeds from the sale of merchandise to fund its operation.

In January 2005, the Trust launched a petition to bring about a citizens' initiated referendum on the issue. Had it been successful, a referendum would have been held at the 2005 general election. The petition was supported by a number of high-profile New Zealanders, including former Governor-General Catherine Tizard, broadcaster Keith Quinn and sportswoman Dame Susan Devoy. However, the Trust failed to attract enough signatures, and six months after its launch, the petition had been signed by 100,000 people (the signatures of 270,000 – 10 per cent of eligible voters – were required to trigger a referendum). After Telecom New Zealand and New Zealand Post reneged on an offer to distribute the petition nationwide, the Trust withdrew the petition. Lloyd Morrison attributed the failure to apathy from the general public, while supporters of New Zealand's current flag attributed the petition's failure to the popularity of that flag.

In 2014, Prime Minister John Key announced his intention to hold a referendum on New Zealand's flag. In May 2015, the group launched a campaign in support of changing the flag. With the NZ Flag.com Trust dissolved, a new group, New Flag New Zealand Incorporated, with many of the same members, was formed. Following the failure of the flag referendum, Change the NZ Flag was wound-up and its web domain and Facebook page were taken over by New Zealand Republic, also led by Lewis Holden.

== 2015–2016 referendums ==
Shortly after the referendum announcement, party leaders reviewed draft legislation and selected candidates for a Flag Consideration Panel. The purpose of this group was to publicise the process, seek flag submissions and suggestions from the public, and decide on a final shortlist of options. Open consultation and design solicitation garnered 10,292 design suggestions from the public, later reduced to a longlist of 40 designs and then a shortlist of 4 designs to contend in the first referendum.

The first referendum took place between 20 November and 11 December 2015 and asked, "If the New Zealand flag changes, which flag would you prefer?" Voters were presented with several options selected by the Flag Consideration Panel. The black, white, and blue silver fern flag by Kyle Lockwood advanced to the second referendum.

The second referendum took place between 3 and 24 March 2016 and asked voters to choose between the selected alternative (the black, white and blue silver fern flag) and the existing New Zealand flag. The final decision was to retain the current flag, by a vote of 56.6% to 43.1%.

=== Reaction ===
Reception of the process and the official options were highly critical, with no great enthusiasm shown among the public. From an aggregation of analyses, the consensus was that the referendum was "a bewildering process that seems to have satisfied few". Political communications professor Claire Robinson labelled the debate an example of groupthink, writing: "I can't figure how the panel can rationalise drawing on old symbols as a way of celebrating us as progressive."

Prime Minister John Key said that he was disappointed by the decision to retain the current flag, while stating he was pleased that the country had a valuable discussion about what it stood for. The failure of the referendum resulted in a loss of political prestige for Key.

== Opinion polling ==
=== Two-option polls ===
Date	Conducted by	For change	Against change	Undecided	Notes
22–26 October 2020	Research New Zealand	19%	56%	26%	This online poll was conducted just after the 2020 general election, approximately four years after the national flag referendum. It did not reference any particular alternative design. Sample size was 1003 respondents and margin of error was 3.1%.
10–15 March 2016	UMR	35%	58%	7%	This poll was framed around the second referendum's "Silver Fern with Black, White and Blue" design as the alternative flag. National voters were more likely to vote for change than those affiliated with other political parties. Younger voters were most against change. Sample size was 750 and margin of error was 3.6%.
25–29 February 2016	UMR	32%	59%	9%	This poll was framed around the second referendum's "Silver Fern with Black, White and Blue" design as the alternative flag. National voters were more likely to vote for change than those affiliated with other political parties. Women were more likely to be against change than men. Sample was 750 eligible voters and margin of error was 3.6%.
February 2016	TV3/Reid Research	30%	70%	0%	16% of those "against change" were in support of change but did not support the proposed flag design of the second referendum.
January 2016	UMR	35%	65%	0%	This poll was conducted after the first referendum had been completed and the "Silver Fern with Black, White and Blue" design was selected as the alternative flag design for the second referendum. One in five were in favour of changing the national flag but disliked the proposed design of the second referendum and planned to vote against change. 80% of that group (i.e. 16% of the whole sample) saw the vote as a way to "send a message to John Key". Sample size was 750 and margin of error was 3.6%.
8 December 2015	HorizonPoll	34%	58%	7%	The poll identified "Silver Fern with Black, White and Blue" and "Silver Fern with Red, White and Blue" as the most popular designs out of the referendum shortlist. Sample size was 2075 and margin of error was 2.2%.
November 2015	TV3/Reid Research	28%	65%	7%	Sample size and margin of error unknown.
8–16 September 2015	Reid Research	25%	69%	6%	The question was asked specifically in relation to the referendum shortlist designs. Sample was 1000 eligible voters and margin of error was 3.1%.
14–24 August 2015	The New Zealand Herald	23%	53%	24%	This poll was conducted after the referendum shortlist had been revealed. Women were more likely to be against change (61%) compared to men (44%). Sample was 750 eligible voters and margin of error was 3.6%.
April 2015	The New Zealand Herald	25%	70%	5%	This poll was conducted after the flag referendum legislation passed in parliament and its details were finalised. 80% agreed that the referendums should first ask if the public wants a change before presenting other designs. When asked about specific design elements, a plurality of 45% preferred the silver fern, followed by the southern cross (18%). Sample was 750 eligible voters and margin of error was 3.6%.
September 2014	TVNZ	35%	65%	0%	Sample size was "almost 1000".
6–16 March 2014	The New Zealand Herald	40.6%	52.6%	6.8%	When asked about specific design elements, a plurality of 42.9% preferred the silver fern, followed by the koru. Resistance to change was higher amongst women, Aucklanders and those in the youngest and oldest age brackets. Sample was 750 eligible voters and margin of error was 3.5%.
February 2014	Colmar Brunton	28%	72%	0%	The poll also found that 85% wanted a change to be decided by the public rather than the government, and that only 2% thought that changing the flag was an important issue in the 2014 general election. Sample size unknown.
July 2013	TV3	61%	39%	0%	Sample size unknown.
2012	University of Auckland and Victoria University of Wellington	29.5%	53.1%	17.4%	Support for a flag change was highest among Green Party voters (49% in favour) and lowest among National Party voters (26% in favour). Sample size was 12182.
January/February 2010	The New Zealand Herald	52.3%	44.4%	3.3%	When asked about specific design elements, a majority of 52.5% preferred the silver fern, followed by the kiwi (18%), koru (13%), southern cross (12.5%) and tiki (1%). Aucklanders and those in the youngest and oldest age brackets expressed significantly more resistance to change. Sample size was 600 and margin of error was 4%.
2009	The New Zealand Herald	25%	62%	13%	Sample size unknown.
2004	Colmar Brunton	42%	58%	0%	Sample size unknown.
August 1999	National Business Review	24%	64%	12%	When presented with the silver fern flag, the numbers changed to 33% supporting change and 60% against.

=== Three-option polls ===
Date	Conducted by	For change	Neutral	Against change	Don't know/Refused	Notes
October 2015	University of Auckland	12%	27%	61%	0%	The 27% figure represents the response "depends on the design". Support for changing the flag was higher amongst males, Wellingtonians and those with higher income, education and right-wing political affiliation. The youngest and oldest age brackets were most against change. Sample size was 838.
September/October 2014	Research New Zealand	19%	37%	43%	1%	Younger respondents were significantly against change compared to older respondents, but no other differences existed between demographic groups (gender, income, location and ethnicity). Sample size was 1001.
March 2014	Research New Zealand	18%	43%	37%	2%	Sample size was 500.
February 2014	Research New Zealand	22%	39%	37%	1%	Sample size was 500.
August 2011	Research New Zealand	19%	30%	52%	1%	Sample size was 1252.

=== Four-option polls ===
Date	Conducted by	Yes, change, to the silver fern	Yes, change, but to something else	Not bothered either way	No, we should not change	Don't know	Notes
February 2014	Fairfax Media/Ipsos	17.9%	23.7%	18.7%	38.6%	1.1%	Total 'change vote' was 41.6%. Sample size was 1018 and margin of error was 3.0%.

=== Other ===
In 2009, The New Zealand Herald surveyed various political party leaders and the twenty two members of the Order of New Zealand, with the results showing an even split.

== Proposals ==
=== Silver fern flag ===
Common version of the silver fern flag

The silver fern flag is a popular unofficial flag of New Zealand. The silver fern itself is a recognised national symbol, and its current and historic usage including:

- The coat of arms of New Zealand
- The artwork on the cover of the New Zealand passport
- The livery on aircraft operated by Air New Zealand
- The visual identity of several government bodies, including the logo of Immigration New Zealand
- The New Zealand one-dollar coin
- The Silver Ferns, New Zealand's national netball team
- The All Blacks, New Zealand's national rugby team
- The Black Caps, New Zealand's national cricket team
- New Zealand Army Second Division military insignia
- New Zealand military insignia during the Second Boer War (1899–1902)
- All tombstones of fallen New Zealand soldiers maintained by the Commonwealth War Graves Commission contain a silver fern symbol
- New Zealand athletes competing in the boycotted 1980 Moscow Olympics competed under the NZOC flag, which is the silver fern flag superimposed over the Olympic rings.
- The NZ Flag.com Trust in their 2005 campaign

The proposal of replacing the national flag of New Zealand with the silver fern flag has been supported by then-Cultural Affairs Minister Marie Hasler, then-Prime Minister Jenny Shipley and the New Zealand Tourism Board in 1998, and then-Prime Minister John Key in 2010. Key later changed his preference to Kyle Lockwood's Silver Fern (Red, White & Blue) design, due to the similarity of the silver fern flag with the jihadist black flag, used by Islamic extremist groups such as ISIL. Amongst the public, polls have shown that the silver fern is the most preferred alternative design for a new national flag.

The New Zealand Flag Institute objects to the silver fern flag, describing it as the logo of some of New Zealand's national sporting teams, and accordingly, not representative of the nation itself. This design originated from the All Blacks. The New Zealand Rugby Union has attempted to claim copyright for silver fern flags.

=== 2015 referendum shortlist ===
On 1 September 2015, the Flag Consideration Panel announced the final four designs to be included in the first referendum. On 23 September, Prime Minister John Key confirmed the Red Peak flag would be added as a fifth option in the flag referendum after growing popular support for the design to be added to the referendum options.

Image	Designer	Name	Notes
	Alofi Kanter	Silver Fern (Black and White)	A variation of the silver fern flag which included the silver fern and the black and white colour scheme. This design uses counterchanging and the fern design from the New Zealand Government's Masterbrand logo. In the referendum, this design was ranked fourth out of the five shortlisted options.
	Kyle Lockwood	Silver Fern (Red, White and Blue)	The silver fern represents the growth of the nation and the Southern Cross represents the location of New Zealand in the antipodes. The blue represents New Zealand's clear atmosphere and the Pacific Ocean. The red represents the country's heritage and sacrifices made. This proposal won a Wellington newspaper flag competition in July 2004 and appeared on TV3 in 2005 after winning a poll which included the present national flag. In the referendum, this design was ranked second out of the five shortlisted options. It was criticised on aesthetic grounds by Hamish Keith, Paul Henry and John Oliver. New Zealand Herald writer Karl Puschmann called it a design for those "sitting on the fence" who didn't want much change and the National Business Review labelled it "amateur" and "dated". Members of the public compared it unfavourably to Weet-Bix packaging, "Kiwi Party Ware" plastic plate packaging, the National Basketball Association logo, or a merger of the Labour and National party logos.
	Kyle Lockwood	Silver Fern (Black, White and Blue)	Variation of the above with black instead of red, and a different shade of blue. This general design was prime minister John Key's preferred proposal. In the referendum, this design was ranked first out of the five shortlisted options. This flag received similar feedback to the red variation.
	Andrew Fyfe	Koru (Black)	Features a Māori koru pattern depicting an unfurling fern frond, traditionally representing new life, growth, strength and peace. In this flag it is meant to also resemble a wave, cloud and ram's horn. In the referendum, this design was ranked fifth out of the five shortlisted options. When this design was revealed on the shortlist, the public immediately nicknamed it "Hypnoflag" via social media.
	Aaron Dustin	Red Peak	This design was inspired by the story of Rangi and Papa (a Māori creation myth) and the geography of New Zealand. It is reminiscent of tāniko patterns and tukutuku panelling. In the referendum, this design was ranked third out of the five shortlisted options. This design was not initially on the official shortlist but a social media campaign to add this design became successful on 23 September 2015. The National Business Review noted that the design community generally preferred this design but it did not resonate with the public at large.

=== Other designs ===
An assortment of historical designs, and formal and informal proposals:

Image	Designer	Date	Notes
	James Busby	1834	The flag of the United Tribes of New Zealand was the national flag of New Zealand when it first declared independence in 1835, until the signing of the Treaty of Waitangi in 1840.
	Mike Davidson	2000	"Black Jack" was designed by art director Mike Davidson in 2000. It was a finalist in the flag competition and became known for its originality and koru-style Union Jack.
	Clark Titman	1967	A simple proposal of a tricolour (red white and blue)
	D.A. Bale	Early 1980s	Blue with a double koru on a broad white vertical band. The double koru was established as the logo of Air New Zealand in 1973.
	Friedensreich Hundertwasser	1983	The koru flag represents an uncurling fern frond in the form of a stylised koru, a traditional Māori carving pattern. This flag is occasionally seen around the country.
	John Ansell, Kenneth Wang, Grant McLachlan	1986, 2015	The Black & Silver flag is based on a stylized version of the original silver ferns used in the emblems of the military and sports representative teams of the 1880s. John Ansell's silver fern flag designs won him a Colenso Scholarship to New York in 1986 and in 1990 came second out of 600 alternative flag designs in The Listener contest to mark New Zealand's sesquicentennial.
	James Dignan	2002	This proposal was displayed in the New Zealand Herald on 9 May 2002, at the time of the centenary of the current flag. It combines elements from the national flag, the Tino rangatiratanga flag and the silver fern flag. This combination looks to links with both the United Kingdom and Polynesia.
	Helen Clark	2007	An informal proposal by Prime Minister Helen Clark. She said that removing the Union Jack from the New Zealand flag was a possibility if people wanted to redesign the flag, leaving it as a "rather attractive Southern Cross."
	James Bowman	2015	The Koru Fern combines two iconic New Zealand symbols: the silver fern and the koru. It was one design that helped stimulate debate prior to official submissions and was submitted to the Flag Consideration Panel as an alternative design for the flag.
	Lucy Gray	2015	A submission to the Flag Consideration Panel, the Laser Kiwi flag features a silver fern and a kiwi shooting a laser beam from its eyes. The flag became a large social media phenomenon, and was used in comedy routines by comedians discussing the flag referendum and New Zealand in general, such as John Oliver.
	Studio Alexander (Grant Alexander, Alice Murray, Thomas Lawlor, Jared McDowell)	2015	The Wā kāinga/Home flag won the $20,000 top prize in the Morgan Foundation's competition. Each coloured triangle represents a culture. They coexist around the white space.

== See also ==
- Australian flag debate
- Great Canadian flag debate
- Northern Ireland flags issue
