= Red Peak flag =

Proposed New Zealand flag

- Other names: Red Peak, First to the Light
- Proportion: 1:2
- Design: Simplified geometric elements based on tāniko pattern representing land, sky, inspired by Rangi and Papa mythology, and a reference to heritage from the 1902 New Zealand flag
- Designed by: Aaron Dustin

The Red Peak flag (also called First to the Light) is a proposed New Zealand flag that appeared as one of five options for voters to consider in the 2015–16 flag referendums. Designed by Aaron Dustin in 2015, Red Peak appeared on the government's official longlist of 40 alternative flag designs before failing a final culling of the field on 1 September 2015 to four options. After public disappointment with the official four-flag shortlist, a social media campaign was launched on 2 September that revived the flag's prospects and captured the attention of leading parliamentary figures both in government and opposition. On 23 September, Prime Minister John Key announced the government had agreed to support Green Party legislation that would add Red Peak to the referendum ballot as a fifth (and the only non-fern inspired) option.

According to its designer, the flag, which features a white chevron surrounded by red, blue, and black coloured triangles, eschews familiar New Zealand iconography such as the fern, koru, kiwi, and Southern Cross in favour of a "new" symbolic language. The design, a simplified reference to the geometric elements of tāniko pattern as well as to the star tips of the current flag, represents the uniqueness of New Zealand's land, light, and position. The white chevron refers to the collision of two tectonic plates that formed the Southern Alps, while the coloured triangles symbolise the red earth, black night, and blue dawn, a reference to the Rangi and Papa creation story in native Māori mythology. In this way, the flag also notes New Zealand's prominence as one of the first countries to "hold the light of new day". It is arguably unique amongst proposed flag alternatives in that it is the only design in the proposed five to visually represent a fusion of both British and Māori cultures, two groups which are especially prominent in New Zealand's history. After counting the preferential votes in the first flag referendum, Red Peak was eliminated after round three of the preferences.

== History ==
The flag was designed by Aaron Dustin along with 17 other flag designs in May to July 2015 as part of the New Zealand Government call for alternative flag designs, and submitted under the pseudonym Andor Unista (an anagram for Aaron Dustin) from Wellington. In August 2015 Red Peak was selected in the long list of 40 flag designs by the Flag Consideration Panel. A quantitative survey conducted from 25 to 31 August 2015 with a nationally representative sample of 1,000 New Zealanders concluded that the flag design ranked 35th place overall, and was the fourth least preferred flag design. Furthermore, within specific groups, it ranked last place (40th) according to people that identify as Māori or as Green voters.

After public disappointment with the official shortlist of four options, a social media campaign was launched on 2 September 2015 for the Red Peak flag, a design well-liked by supporters of changing the New Zealand flag who disapprove of the silver fern flag and other similar proposed designs. Early tweets were followed by a blog post titled 'Dear John' written by Rowan Simpson which attracted significant online attention, and an opinion piece in The New Zealand Herald by journalist Toby Manhire. Despite not being selected by the official Flag Consideration Panel, the Red Peak design was considered a favourable alternative and was supported by a grassroots social media campaign for its inclusion in any public referendum for a new national flag design. An online petition to support inclusion of the flag design as an option for the referendum gained support from 50,000 petitioners in less than two weeks, and was handed over by the family of the petition's creator and Rowan Simpson to David Seymour at Parliament on 16 September 2015.

Party	Third reading
Parties voting Yes
National	59
Labour	32
Green	14
Māori Party	2
ACT	1
United Future	1
Parties voting No
NZ First	12

On 23 September, Green Party MP Gareth Hughes sought to introduce in Parliament a bill to add Red Peak to the first referendum as a fifth option; a block by New Zealand First was circumvented the same day when Prime Minister John Key confirmed the government would pick up the legislation. In order to pass the bill, the House of Representatives went into urgency on 23 September (urgency allows the House to dramatically condense a bill's journey through the legislative process, avoiding referral to a select committee and advancing through all three readings in one day; under normal circumstances, a bill cannot complete more than one stage per day the House is in session). At the third reading, all parties in the House agreed to final passage except New Zealand First, which opposed changing the current flag. Royal assent was granted on 24 September, making the inclusion of Red Peak on the ballot official (Public Act 2015 No. 86). The addition was estimated to cost taxpayers an extra $380,000, as informational materials on enrolment and voting that only featured the initial four alternatives had to be redesigned, reprinted, and retranslated to include Red Peak as a fifth option (no ballot papers had been printed). Despite his willingness to include Red Peak on the ballot paper, Prime Minister Key remained a supporter of Kyle Lockwood's two silver fern designs; had Red Peak won the first referendum, Key confirmed he would have supported it over the current flag in the second referendum.

== Support for inclusion in referendum ==
Party leaders:

- ACT New Zealand leader David Seymour
- Green Party co-leader James Shaw
- Labour Party leader Andrew Little, conditional on the government's agreement to alter the referendum so that New Zealanders were first asked whether they want change.
- Māori Party co-leader Marama Fox

Editorial boards:

- The New Zealand Herald
- The Dominion Post

== Similar flag designs ==
=== Wā Kāinga/Home flag ===
Wā Kāinga/Home flag by Studio Alexander

Like Red Peak, the Wā Kāinga/Home flag by Studio Alexander, an Auckland-based design studio, also makes use of a white chevron surrounded by red, blue, and black triangles, although its interpretation of the resulting space is different. According to the official description of the design submitted to the government by designers Grant Alexander (principal), Alice Murray, Thomas Lawlor, and Jared McDowell, each of the flag's coloured triangles represents a particular cultural tradition of New Zealand: red for the Māori people, blue for the British settlers, and black for the strength and optimism of its multicultural future. Furthermore, the white space between the colours recalls the maihi (diagonal bargeboards) on the front of a traditional Māori meeting house and symbolises the "coming together" of all three cultures. In this respect, the design's symbolism is reminiscent of the flag of South Africa.

Wā Kāinga/Home met with initial success. On 27 July 2015, it won the $20,000 grand prize at a flag competition hosted by the Morgan Foundation (economist and philanthropist Gareth Morgan, believing the government's design brief to be too vague, had set up his own competition to help stimulate public discussion and creativity; Morgan's own brief sought flag designs that would honour the spirit of the Treaty of Waitangi). In doing so, Wā Kāinga/Home defeated just under 1,000 other submissions. Fresh off this victory, Wā Kāinga/Home also survived the first round of the government's official flag competition when on 10 August 2015 the Flag Consideration Panel publicly announced its long list of 40 alternative flag designs. Like Red Peak, however, Wā Kāinga/Home subsequently faltered on 1 September 2015, failing to make the government's final four.

A variant of Wā Kāinga / Home, with darker colours and a wider ratio, was used as the logo of Gareth Morgan's party, The Opportunities Party.

== Public debate ==
Support for the Red Peak flag has come from the New Zealand design community with noted designers, design lecturers, and authors voicing their support for the geometric abstract design.

Critics of the Red Peak flag design have noted it bears a resemblance to some corporate logos. Red Peak's opponents sought to use the similarities between the design and the logos of Peak Engineering & Design of Apex, North Carolina, and Arrow Uniforms of New Zealand to scuttle the flag's bid for a referendum spot. Supporters of the design have dismissed this tactic as both culturally insensitive and a "red herring" (given the designs have different colour and form). In September 2015 the New Zealand First MP Denis O'Rourke showed how four of the flags placed together would resemble the Flag of Nazi Germany. Ron Mark, of New Zealand First, said that the flag has a similar appearance to the designs on Nazi sentry boxes.

The first round of the referendum used instant-runoff voting (IRV). Due to there being two flag designs that were the same design but different colour, some argued that this would "stack the deck" against the Red Peak and koru flag designs. However, this argument was flawed, since IRV does not give an advantage to groups of options that are similar. In technical terms, near-identical options are called clones, and IRV is known to be independent of clones.

== See also ==
- New Zealand flag debate
- List of New Zealand flags
