= New Zealand Flag Institute =

The New Zealand Flag Institute was established in 2005 amidst a campaign by the NZ Flag.com Trust for a referendum to change the New Zealand flag. The campaign to bring about a citizens-initiated referendum on the subject subsequently failed.

== History ==
The organisation was founded by Aucklander John Cox (1965–2017), a New Zealand vexillolographer and lawyer.

The flag has stood the test of time. A country that abandons its old symbols for no better reason than to follow changing fashions has lost its heart and neglected its heritage.

— John Cox, head of the New Zealand Flag Institute.

== Aims ==
The Institute's primary aim is to educate New Zealanders about the history and symbolism of the New Zealand Flag. The Institute also aims to encourage people to understand and appreciate what the flag stands for. It also encourages New Zealanders to fly the flag whenever and wherever possible.

== See also ==
- Australian flag debate
- List of proposed Australian flags
- Ausflag
- New Zealand flag debate
