= Hundertwasser koru flag =

Proposed secondary flag for New Zealand

Hundertwasser's koru flag

A koru flag was designed by Friedensreich Hundertwasser in 1983 and proposed as a secondary flag for New Zealand.

== Overview ==
As black is a traditional colour of the Māori, the flag has a black strip on the left side. There is a fern green spiral which starts by taking up the entire width of the flag but decreases gradually, splitting it diagonally and finally curling up into a spiral on the right side. This curling fern is based on a Māori pattern known as the koru, and the corresponding white spiral alludes to Aotearoa, a Māori name for New Zealand meaning Land of the Long White Cloud. Hundertwasser also saw the design as representing humanity in harmony with nature.

It is claimed by some New Zealanders that the current flag of New Zealand is a reminder of British colonialism and does not truly represent their culture; however, those who support the current flag say that it represents the history of the country as a part of the British Empire and location in the Southern Hemisphere.

The flag can be seen on the counter of the convenience store in the 1997 film subUrbia.

'Modern Hundertwasser' flag

Koru (Black) flag

A design based on Hundertwasser's flag with the black bar removed was submitted by Tomas Cottle in the 2015–2016 New Zealand flag referendums under the name 'Modern Hundertwasser'. It was initially selected for inclusion in the long list of 40 designs, but was removed due to a copyright claim by the Hundertwasser Foundation.

== See also ==
- New Zealand flag debate
- List of New Zealand flags
