= Claire Robinson (academic) =

New Zealand political communications academic

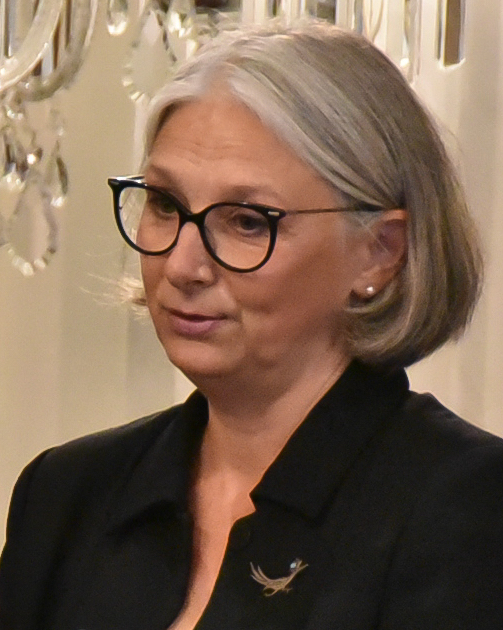
- Robinson in 2020
- Education: Massey University
- Scientific career
- Fields: Political communications
- Workplaces: Massey University
- Thesis: Advertising and the market orientation of political parties contesting the 1999 and 2002 New Zealand general election campaigns (2006)
- Website: clairerobinson.org

Claire Elizabeth Robinson is a New Zealand political communications academic. As of 2018, she is a full professor and pro vice-chancellor at the Massey University.

== Academic career ==
After a 2006 PhD titled 'Advertising and the market orientation of political parties contesting the 1999 and 2002 New Zealand general election campaigns' at the Massey University, Robinson joined the staff, rising to full professor.

Robinson was a finalist in both the 2015 and 2017 'Women of influence' awards and was a finalist in the Wellingtonian of the year 2017 awards. Robinson appears very frequently across a range of New Zealand news media on a range of political topics as a political commentator.
