= Lockwood silver fern flag =

Proposed flag for New Zealand

- Preferred Alternative New Zealand Flag
- Use: Official alternative New Zealand flag voted by the people in the first of the New Zealand flag referendums in 2015.
- Proportion: 1:2
- Design: A silver fern representing the multi-cultural people of New Zealand, and Southern Cross referencing the antipodean location of the country.
- Designed by: Kyle Lockwood

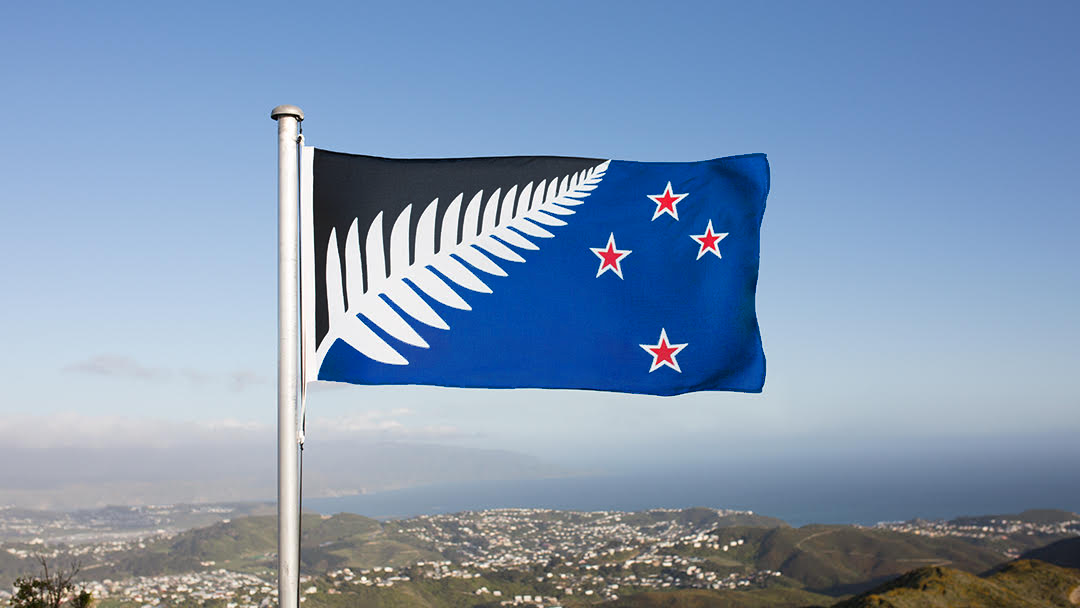
Lockwood's silver fern flag over Wellington, New Zealand

The black, white and blue silver fern flag is a proposed flag for New Zealand by architectural designer Kyle Lockwood. It was first designed using different colours in 2000. It was voted as the preferred alternative New Zealand flag in the first of two New Zealand flag referendums in December 2015, and was used in the second flag referendum in a binding contest against the current New Zealand flag. Despite a UMR poll predicting that the flag would earn only 35% of the vote, the Silver Fern Flag gained a significant minority in the March 2016 referendum with 43.2% of the vote, whilst the existing flag won with 56.6% of the vote.

== Design and symbolism ==
The design of the flag combines the silver fern flag (toward the hoist) with the stars of the current national flag. The silver fern frond is a popular symbol of the people of New Zealand, while the stellar constellation known as the Southern Cross represents the antipodean location of the country in the Southern Hemisphere. The multiple pinnates on the silver fern leaf represent New Zealand's multicultural society, a single fern spreading upwards representing one people growing into the future. Black, white, and red are the national colours of New Zealand traditionally associated with the Māori people; while blue is dominant in the current national flag and symbolises the South Pacific Ocean.

== History ==
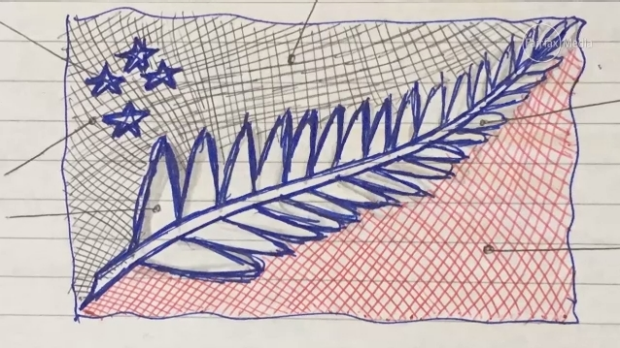
Kyle Lockwood's original Silver fern flag sketch from 2000

Digital reproduction of Kyle Lockwood's original Silver fern flag sketch from 2000

Kyle Lockwood's prototype Silver fern flag which won a newspaper competition in 2004

The official Preferred Alternative New Zealand Flag voted by New Zealand in the first flag referendum

The original 2000 sketch design used black in the upper left corner, and the first prototype design used red in the upper left corner, and a darker shade of blue for the main part of the flag. The blue represented the ocean, the red represented Māori and also sacrifices during wartime, and the white of the fern is a reference to the "Land of the Long White Cloud" (translated from the Māori "Aotearoa"). This design was first published by Lockwood in 2003, and won a competition in July 2004 run by The Hutt News. The flag appeared on Campbell Live in 2004 and won an online poll that included the present national flag.

Lockwood has produced the flag in several of colour combinations and designs, including more and fewer fern fronds. Some New Zealanders believe that the current New Zealand flag is a reminder of British colonialism and does not truly represent their culture; however, those who support the current flag say that it represents the history of the country as a part of the British Empire and location in the Southern Hemisphere.

Lockwood's winning entry in the New Zealand flag referendum had black instead of red, and a brighter shade of blue. This design is John Key's preferred proposal. The original red design was criticised on aesthetic grounds by Hamish Keith, Paul Henry and John Oliver. The New Zealand Herald writer Karl Puschmann called it a design for those "sitting on the fence" who didn't want much change. Members of the public had also compared it unfavourably to Weet-Bix packaging, or a merger of the Labour and National party logos. It was also likened to the design of a beach towel. However, Lockwood pointed out that most national flags were made into beach towels. The Royal New Zealand Air Forces 3 Squadron complained that the flag was a copyright violation of their 2010 insignia until the Air Force discovered that Lockwood's flag preceded their insignia by many years.

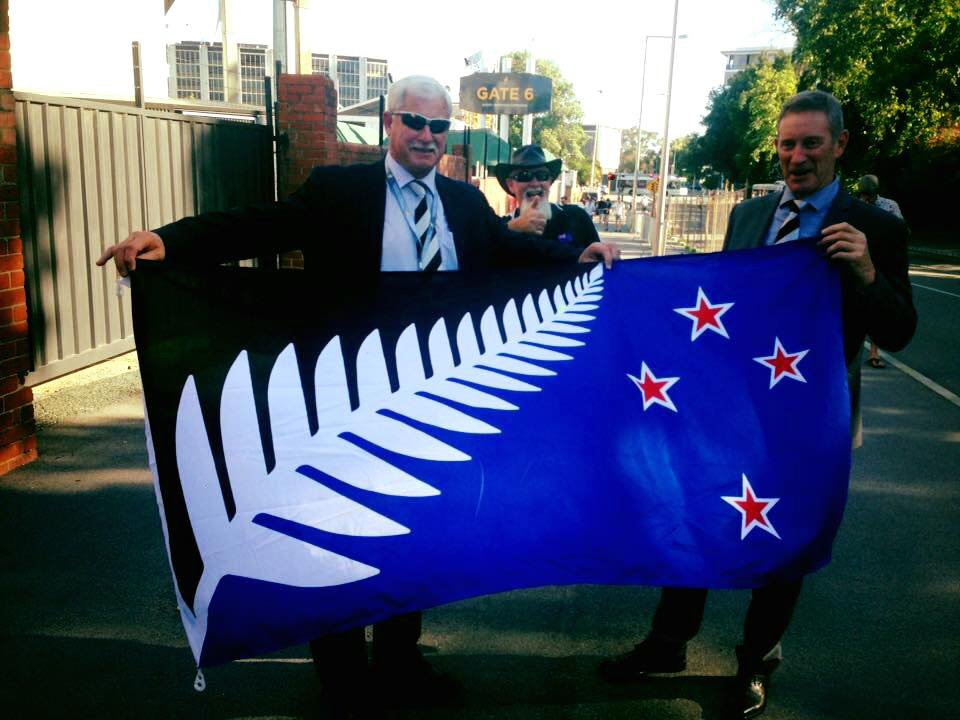
Sir Richard Hadlee (on left) supporting the flag in November 2015

Prominent New Zealanders, including former Governor General Dame Catherine Tizard, All Black Dan Carter, Olympian Ian Fergusson, cricketing great Sir Richard Hadlee, Olympic athlete Sir Peter Snell, Mahe Drysdale, and former All Black captain Richie McCaw came out in support of the alternative design. After the 2015 Rugby World Cup final between Australia and New Zealand in Twickenham, England, Richie McCaw said "Running out at Twickenham and seeing the two flags looking so similar. The silver fern has always been the special symbol on the All Black jersey that represents who we are as kiwis, so the new flag with a silver fern as a part of it would be a great option I believe." On the subject of flag change Dame Cath Tizard said "We don't wear the clothes of a century ago or drive around today in Model T Fords. Our present flag served a young post-colonial country well, but the time has come to consider a change which more appropriately recognises our changed identity and confidence in ourselves."

After the second referendum, the flag continued to make appearances in the International media. In the first New Zealand cricket test against Zimbabwe on 28 July 2016, the flag was featured in the opening graphics sequence, The flag is also seen flying from flagpoles around New Zealand, Kip Colvey a prominent US/NZ football player, appeared in Fairfax media on 26 December 2016, in front of the flag.

Lockwood's silver fern design features in the livery of the 'Electron' rocket in Rocket Lab's New Zealand space program, The first Electron rocket was scheduled to launch in late 2016.

The silver fern design will also feature in the Orewa Walk of Fame in Auckland which was scheduled to be dedicated in September 2016.

== Versions ==
Five versions of Lockwood's flag were included in the Flag Consideration Panel's long list for the referendums. Two of them, the original red, white and blue and the winning black, white and blue versions, reached the short list of four (later five) flags.

Silver Fern (Red, White and Blue) (shortlisted)

Silver Fern (Black, White and Red)

Silver Fern (Black, White and Blue) (shortlisted)

Silver Fern (Black with Red Stars)

Silver Fern (Black & White)

=== Other versions ===
Silver Fern (Green, White and Blue)

Silver Fern (Black, White & Green)

Silver Fern (White and Blue)

Silver Fern (Black, White & Blue Variant)

== Service flags with the Lockwood silver fern flag ==
New service flags were proposed for New Zealand following the Lockwood Silver Fern Flag. The option of changing these flags was not, however, included in the referendum.

== See also ==
- Hundertwasser koru flag
- List of New Zealand flags
