= Tukutuku =

Māori art form of New Zealand

Tukutuku panelling is a distinctive art form of the Māori people of New Zealand, a traditional latticework used to decorate meeting houses (wharenui). Other names are Tuitui and Arapaki. Tukutuku flank the posts around the edge of the wharenui; the posts are usually carved and represent ancestors. The patterns of tukutuku have symbolic meanings.

Tukutuku are made with various materials. One description is vertical rods of toetoe stalks, with wooden slats across. These slats are held in place with knotting or weaving that forms a decorative pattern. The materials for this weaving are narrow strips of kiekie or harakeke, some died black and the coastal plant pingao as yellow colour. The traditional skills of tukutuku are held mostly within the Māori women weaving community alongside other Māori traditional weaving techniques as the skills of whakaīro (carving) are mostly held within the Māori men carving community. Tukutuku for a wharenui are designed alongside the tohunga whakairo (master carver) as they have in mind the relationship to the other elements of the carvings and kōwhaiwhai to complement each other.

A wide range of named patterns have developed, and these now are used in a wide variety of modern contexts and act as a form of inspiration to New Zealand creative artists. Some of the names of tukutuku patterns are:

- poutama – a stepped pattern, said to represent whakapapa, learning and the ascent of the god Tāne-o-te-wānanga into the heavens to attain superior knowledge and religion.
- roimata toroa – meaning "albatross tears", formed with vertical stitches and said to represent misfortune and disaster.
- kaokao – horizontal or vertical zigzag lines, said to represent the sides and arms of warriors in haka.
- purapura whetū – meaning "star seeds", also known as pukanohi ("herring's eyes") and kowhiti ("to cross"), is a simple cross-stitch pattern representing the stars and great numbers of people.

Distinctive tukutuku can be seen in the Hotunui meeting house that is being looked after by the Auckland Museum. These panels were made by women of Ngāti Maru at Parawai when the house was originally built in 1878. They are said to be the oldest and most complete tukutuku and have many motifs with a range of very complex patterns to simplicity.

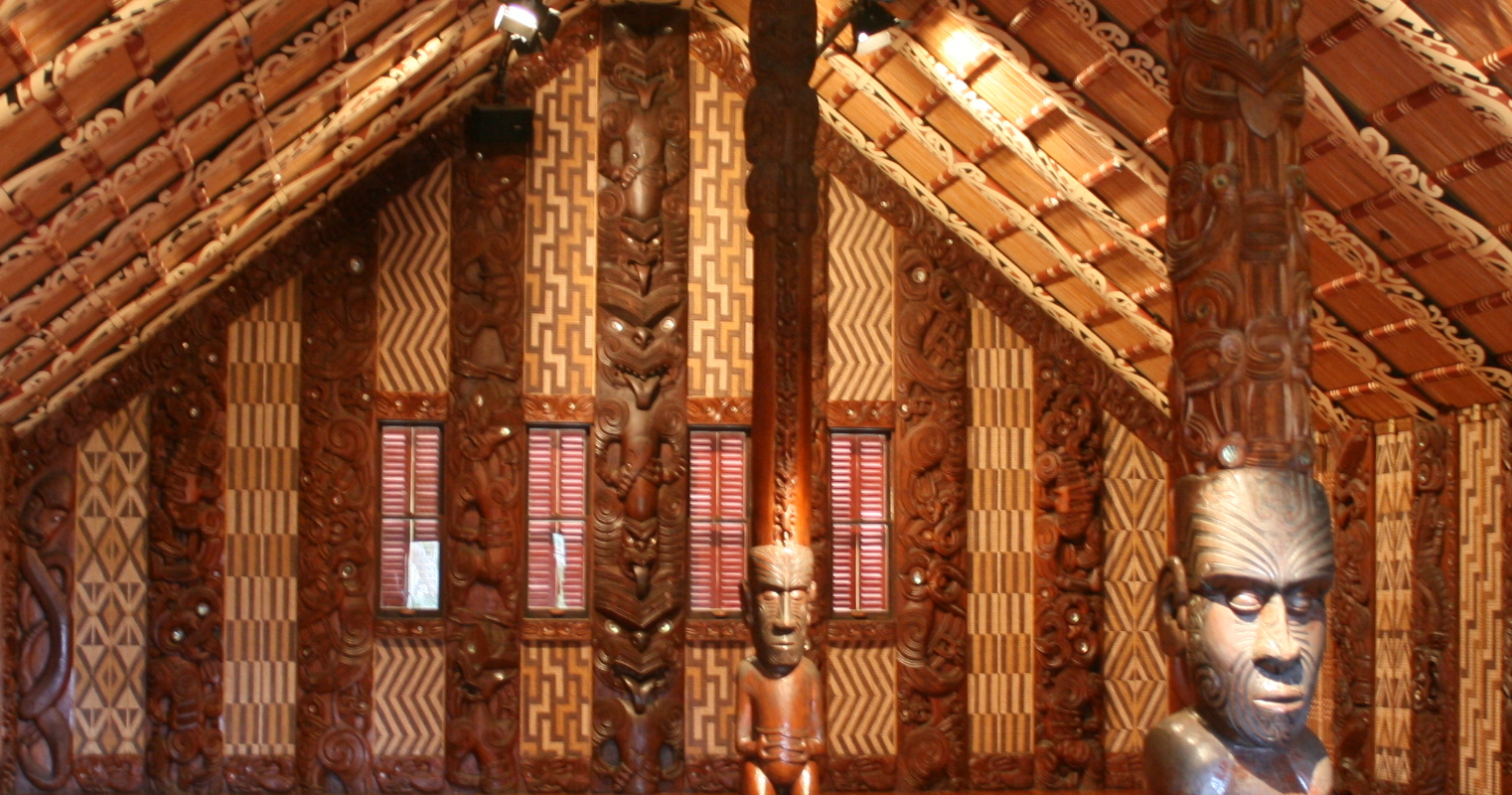
Interior of the wharenui on the Treaty Grounds at Waitangi, showing whakairo, tukutuku and kōwhaiwhai together

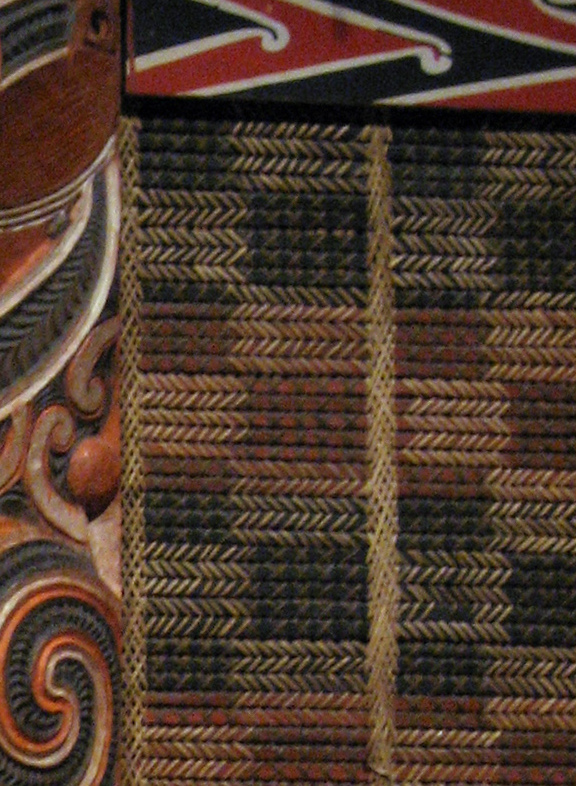
Closeup of tukutuku in the wharenui Hotunui (1878)

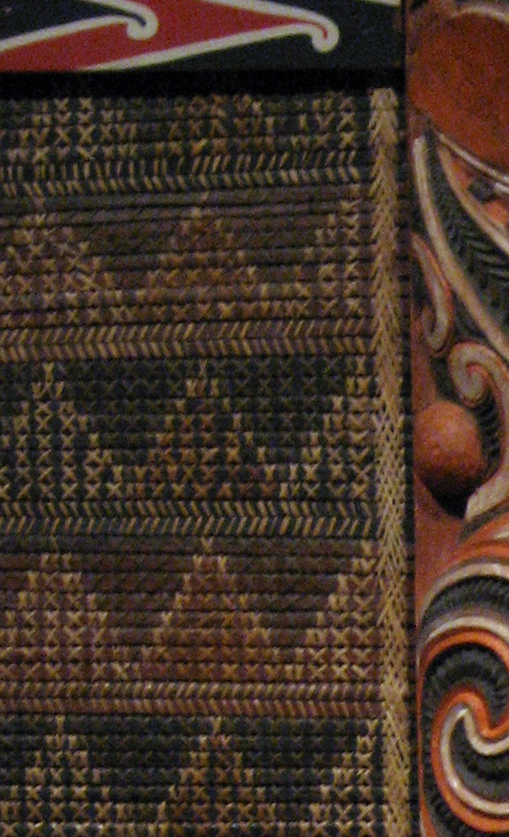
Closeup of tukutuku in the wharenui Hotunui (1878)

== Examples ==
- http://www.teara.govt.nz/en/te-ao-marama-the-natural-world/2/2/1
- http://christchurchcitylibraries.com/Heritage/Photos/Libraries/Central/TukutukuPanels/panel-04.asp
