= Laser Kiwi flag =

Proposed flag for New Zealand

- Use: Proposed
- Proportion: 1:2
- Design: A black flag depicting an iconic New Zealand silver fern and a kiwi shooting a green laser beam from its eye.
- Designed by: Lucy Gray

The Laser Kiwi flag, originally titled Fire the Lazar, was designed in 2015 by Lucy Gray as a proposed flag of New Zealand for the 2015–2016 New Zealand flag referendums. It has since become a social media phenomenon that has generated ongoing interest in the design.

== Background ==
The Laser Kiwi flag was created in 2015 by Lucy Gray, a former ACT Party candidate, as a proposed flag of New Zealand. She produced the flag design in Microsoft Paint during an evening. Inspired by the many "deadly animals" in Australia, she took a Kiwi icon and turned it into a deadly animal. When the initial four chosen options were released for the first stage of the New Zealand flag referendums, Gray stated that she was "uninspired" by the designs as they "didn't derive much meaning" for her.

During the New Zealand flag referendums, the Laser Kiwi flag became a large social media phenomenon and was used in comedy routines by comedians, such as John Oliver, discussing the flag referendum and New Zealand in general. The flag features a silver fern and a kiwi shooting a green laser beam from its eyes. The description of the flag was that "[t]he laser beam projects a powerful image of New Zealand. I believe my design is so powerful it does not need to be discussed." It was often joked by comedians that if the flag was to become the official flag of New Zealand, it would cause "fear" in New Zealand's enemies.

The design was one of over 10,000 submitted to the referendums, and was dropped out of consideration to be an alternative flag for New Zealand.

== Post-referendum popularity ==
After the referendum, the flag's popularity made a "comeback" as it became widely available as a consumer product, and is often seen at events such as sports or concerts across and outside of New Zealand. During the Russian invasion of Ukraine, the Laser Kiwi flag was used as a symbol by volunteer soldiers from New Zealand. Similar designs were submitted for the 2023 contest to redesign the flag of Minnesota, featuring a loon with laser eyes as well as the 2025 contest to redesign the flag of Illinois, featuring a cardinal with laser eyes. Another one that has been noted was from the flag of Massachusetts redesign submissions in 2025, which features an orca with laser eyes.
