= Koru =

Spiral shape of an unfurling fern frond

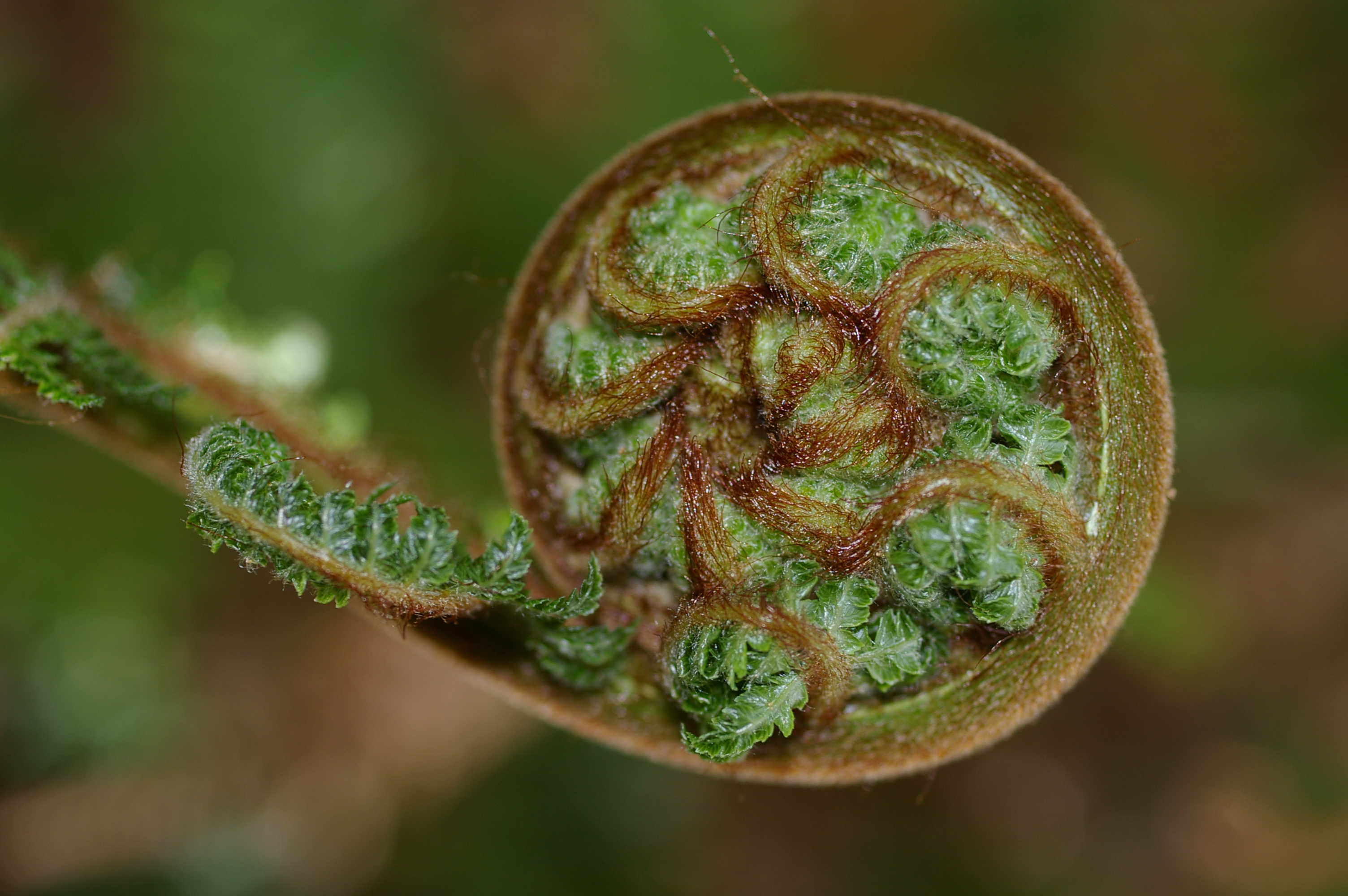
An unfurling silver fern frond

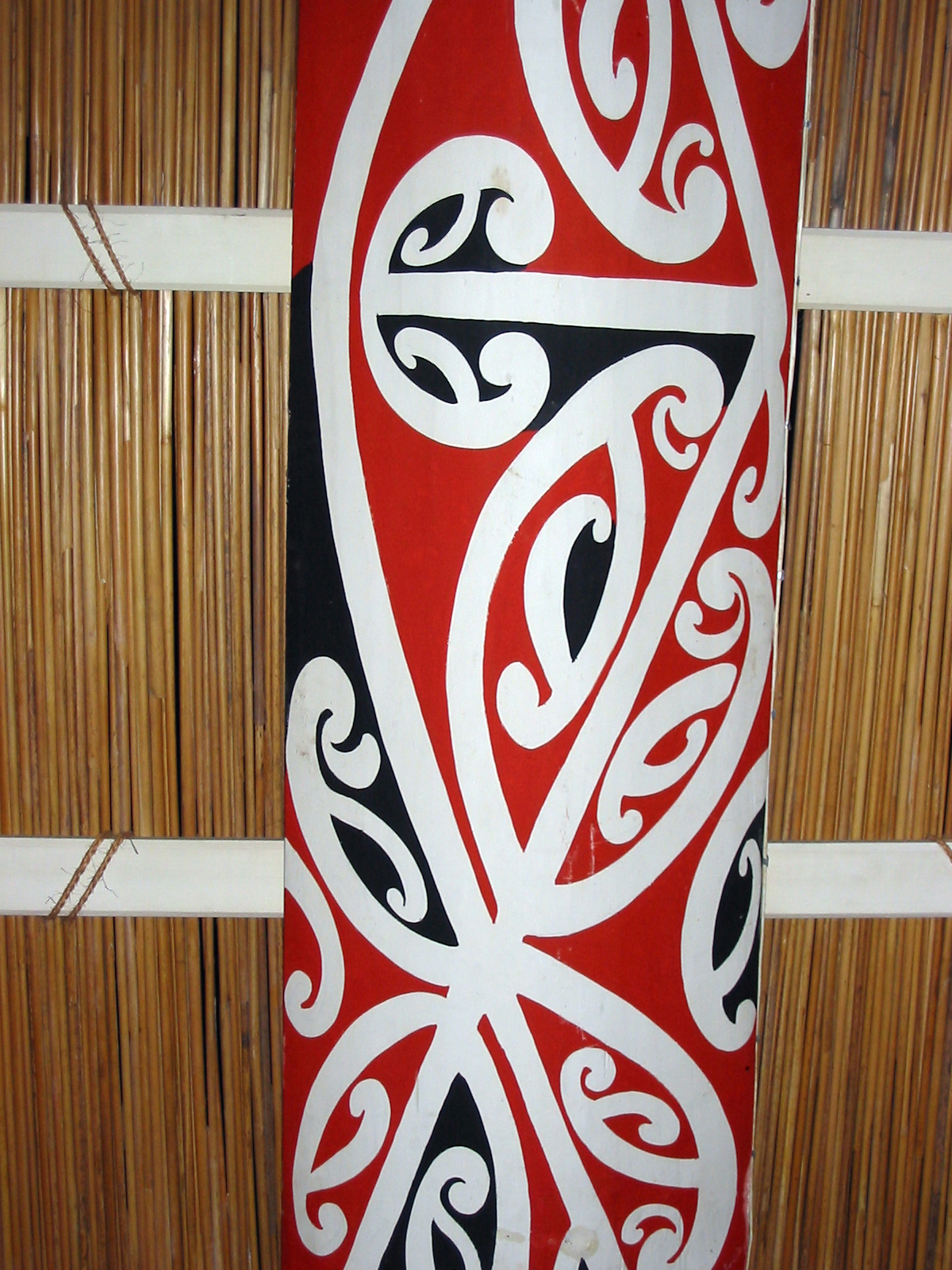
Koru kōwhaiwhai patterns on a rafter from the Ngāti Maru wharenui Hotunui

The koru flag

The koru (Māori for 'loop or coil') is a spiral shape evoking a newly unfurling frond from a silver fern frond. It is an integral symbol in Māori art, carving and tattooing, where it symbolises new life, growth, strength and peace. Its shape "conveys the idea of perpetual movement," while the inner coil "suggests returning to the point of origin".

== Use in traditional design ==
The koru is the integral motif of the symbolic and seemingly abstract kōwhaiwhai designs traditionally used to decorate wharenui (meeting houses). There are numerous semi-formal designs, representing different features of the natural world.

== More recent adaptations ==
The logo of Air New Zealand, the national carrier, incorporates a koru design — based on the Ngaru (Ngāti Kahungunu) kōwhaiwhai pattern — as a symbol of New Zealand flora. The logo was introduced in 1973 to coincide with the arrival of the airline's first McDonnell Douglas DC-10 wide-body jet. Several other nationwide organisations also use a koru in their logos, among them the New Zealand Department of Conservation.

In 1983, Friedensreich Hundertwasser based his proposed design for a secondary New Zealand flag on the symbol. It also formed the basis for a notable series of artworks by Gordon Walters. Koru swirls are also reminiscent of the Tomoe symbol in Japan.

The New Zealand Police use their own adaptions of the koru, the police koru is used in all version of the police logo. According to police "the koru is a reference to te ao Māori and a celebration of Aotearoa New Zealand’s unique heritage. Its connotations of encapsulation, protection and peace align with our values as an organisation and reiterate New Zealand Police’s commitment to Māori." Many parts of the police koru are used to symbiose police values such as the 8° angle which represents the continuous forward momentum police strive for and the flat or 'sharp' bottom, which represents the solid foundations of Police.

The O in Whakaata Māori's logo is a koru.

The New Zealand national korfball team is nicknamed The Korus.
