= Lockwood (surname) =

Lockwood is a surname. Notable people with the surname include:

== People ==
- Amos D. Lockwood (1811–1884), American engineer and manufacturer
- Annea Lockwood (born 1939), New Zealand-born American composer
- Belva Ann Lockwood (1830–1917), American feminist, lawyer and politician
- Benoni Lockwood III (1805–1851), American clipper ship captain
- Betty Lockwood (1924–2019), British political activist
- Bobby Lockwood (born 1993), British actor
- Cara Lockwood, American writer
- Charles Lockwood (disambiguation), several people
- Daniel N. Lockwood (1844–1906), American politician
- Dave Lockwood (tiddlywinks) (born 1952/53), American tiddlywinks champion
- David Lockwood (sociologist) (1929–2014), British sociologist
- David J. Lockwood, Canadian physicist
- Didier Lockwood (1956–2018), French jazz violinist
- Dorothy Lockwood (1910–1991), British painter
- Eliphalet Lockwood (deacon) (1675–1753), deacon, and member of the Connecticut House of Representatives
- Eliphalet Lockwood (1741–1814), American politician and Revolutionary War captain
- Elise Lockwood, American scholar of mathematics education
- Gary Lockwood (born 1937), American actor
- George Lockwood (born 1872, date of death unknown), Australian footballer
- George Lockwood (politician) (born 1862, date of death unknown), mayor of Norwalk, Connecticut
- Gerald Lockwood (1928–2015), rugby league footballer
- Guy H. Lockwood (1870–1947), American political activist and cartoonist
- Harold Lockwood (1887–1918), American silent film actor
- Henry Francis Lockwood (1811–1878), English architect
- Henry Hayes Lockwood (1814–1899), American soldier
- James Lockwood (disambiguation)
- Jess Lockwood (bull rider) (born 1997), American professional bull rider
- Joseph Lockwood (1904–1991), British industrialist and chairman of EMI
- Julia Belden Lockwood (1881–1976), American philanthropist
- Kyle Lockwood (born 1977), New Zealand architect and designer of the Lockwood silver fern flag
- Lockwood Smith (born 1948), New Zealand politician
- Lorna E. Lockwood (1903–1977), American jurist
- Luke Vincent Lockwood (1872–1951), American author of books on classic furniture design
- Margaret Lockwood (1916–1990), British actress
- Mary Anne Lockwood (1858–1938), Australian temperance worker and suffragist
- Matthew Lockwood (born 1976), English footballer
- Michael Lockwood (disambiguation), a list of people named Michael or Mike Lockwood
- Nadine Lockwood (1991–1996), American murder victim
- Normand Lockwood (1906–2002), American composer
- Patricia A. Lockwood, American politician
- Preston Lockwood (1912–1996), English actor
- Priscilla Lockwood (1936–2019), American politician
- Robert Lockwood, Jr. (1915–2006), American blues musician
- Rowan Lockwood, American paleobiologist
- Samuel D. Lockwood (1789–1874), American lawyer and politician
- Stuart Lockwood, British boy kept hostage by Saddam Hussein during the Gulf war
- Thomas Lockwood (disambiguation)
- Todd Lockwood (born 1957), American fantasy and science fiction artist
- Ward Lockwood (1894–1963), American artist
- William Lockwood (disambiguation), a list of people named William, Will, Bill or Billy Lockwood

== Fictional characters ==
- Mr Lockwood, in Emily Brontë's 1847 novel Wuthering Heights
- Jonah Lockwood, serial killer alter ego of Whitney scion Keith Whitney from the soap opera The Edge of Night
- Lockwood, in the 2004 play The History Boys
- Anthony Lockwood, from Jonathan Stroud's YA series Lockwood & Co
- Flint Lockwood, from the film Cloudy With a Chance of Meatballs

== See also ==
- Justice Lockwood (disambiguation)
