= Lockwood =

Lockwood may refer to:

== Places ==
=== Australia ===
- Lockwood, Victoria
- Lockwood South, Victoria

=== Canada ===
- Lockwood, Saskatchewan

=== United Kingdom ===
- Lockwood, North Yorkshire, England
- Lockwood, West Yorkshire, England

=== United States ===
- Lockwood, Amador County, California
- Lockwood, Monterey County, California
- Lockwood, Michigan, an unincorporated community in Ovid Township, Branch County, Michigan
- Lockwood, Missouri
- Lockwood, Montana
- Lockwood, Nebraska
- Lockwood, New York, an unincorporated hamlet in the town of Barton, New York.
- Lockwood, West Virginia

=== Greenland ===
- Lockwood Island

== Other uses ==
- Lockwood (surname), a list of people and fictional characters
- Lockwood & Co., book series
  - Lockwood & Co. (TV series), TV series adaptation
- Lockwood (company), lock brand in Australia
- Lockwood Aircraft, an American ultralight aircraft manufacturer
- Lockwood Broadcast Group, an American broadcasting company
- Lockwood v. American Airlines, Inc., a 1997 United States patent law case
- USS Lockwood
