= Charles Lockwood =

Charles Lockwood may refer to:

- Charles Lockwood (author) (1948–2012), American writer and consultant on green business strategies
- Charles A. Lockwood (1890–1967), United States Navy admiral
- Charles A. Lockwood (politician), Oregon politician in 35th Oregon Legislative Assembly
- Charles Barrett Lockwood (1856–1914), British surgeon and anatomist
- Charles C. Lockwood (1877–1958), New York politician and judge
- Charles Lockwood (criminal) (c. 1851–1886), American criminal
- Lynching of Charles Lockwood (died 1886), American farmhand possibly lynched in Connecticut
