= Silver fern flag =

Flag design often associated with New Zealand

The common version of the Silver Fern flag, similar to the All Blacks logo

A silver fern flag is any flag design that incorporates a silver fern, and is usually a white silver fern on a black background. The silver fern motif is associated with New Zealand, and a silver fern flag may be used as an unofficial flag of New Zealand, to which it is endemic. The silver fern itself is a quasi-national emblem, being used for various official symbols, including the coat of arms of New Zealand and the New Zealand one dollar coin. A number of New Zealand sports teams, such as the cricket team, the netball team and the rugby union team, use similar silver fern flags as part of their official merchandise. The All Whites, New Zealand's national association football team, use a white background and a black version of the fern.

The flag of the New Zealand Olympic Committee from 1979-1994

== 1980 Moscow Summer Olympics ==
New Zealand officially boycotted the 1980 Moscow Olympics as part of the US-led boycott of the games. However, four New Zealand athletes competed under the flag of New Zealand's Olympic committee, which was a black flag with a white silver fern imposed over the Olympic Rings.

== National flag proposals ==
The first suggestion that a silver fern flag be adopted as New Zealand's official flag came in 1998 from Cultural Affairs Minister Marie Hasler of the National Party. Hasler's proposal was backed by then Prime Minister Jenny Shipley. Along with the New Zealand Tourism Board, Shipley backed a white silver fern on a black background as a possible alternative flag, along the lines of the Canadian Maple Leaf flag.

In 2003, New Zealand's America's Cup team, Team New Zealand, launched the "Loyal" campaign, using a silver fern flag and a song of the same name by New Zealand musician Dave Dobbyn.

New Zealand Prime Minister John Key preferred the All Blacks version of the silver fern flag, but opponents of the design believe it gives undue emphasis to the country's sport, or resembles a pirate flag or the Islamic Black Standard as used by ISIL.

== 2005 referendum proposal ==
Cameron Sanders' proposed New Zealand flag

In January 2005, the NZ Flag.com Trust, using a stylised silver fern flag designed by Cameron Sanders, launched a petition to initiate a referendum on the flag issue, but failed to attract enough signatures.

== 2015–2016 referendums ==
Kyle Lockwood's silver fern flag was voted on in the 2015 & 2016 national referendums.

On 11 March 2014, the Prime Minister of New Zealand, John Key, announced a referendum on whether to change the New Zealand flag or not, to be held within three years, saying that he liked the silver fern as an option. Of the 10,292 design submissions, approximately 3,113 incorporated elements of a fern, 12 designs of 40 were selected for the long list, and three flag designs to the shortlist alternatives have a silver fern.

== Gallery ==
The Black & Silver flag is based on a stylised version of the original silver ferns used in the emblems of the military and sports representative teams of the 1880s. John Ansell's silver fern flag designs won him a Colenso Scholarship to New York in 1986 and in 1990 came second out of 600 alternative flag designs in The Listener contest to mark New Zealand's sesquicentennial.

James Dignan's 2002 proposed New Zealand flag

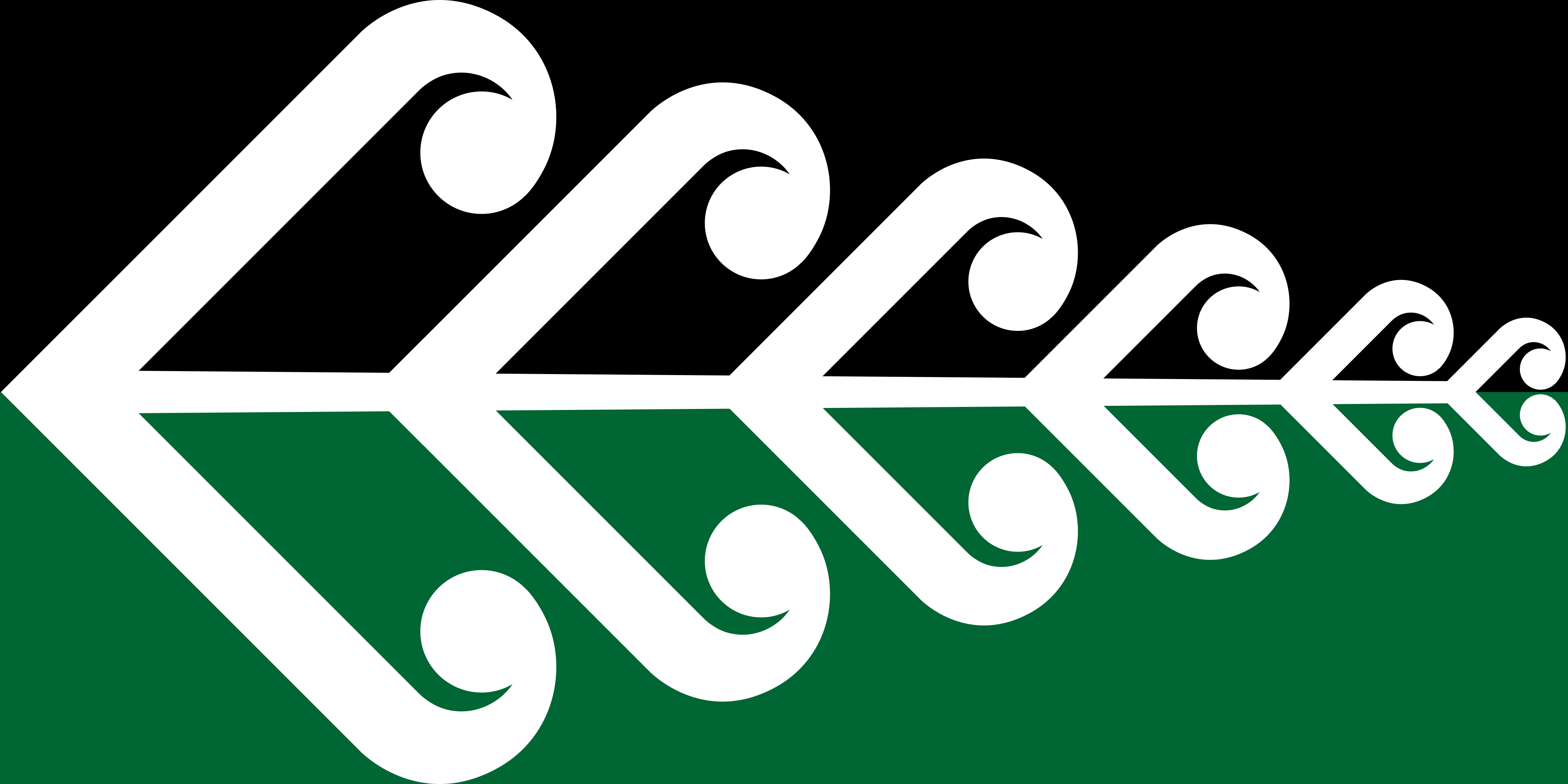
James Bowman's suggested New Zealand flag. The Koru Fern combines two iconic New Zealand symbols: the silver fern and the koru. It was one design that helped stimulate debate prior to official submissions and was submitted to the New Zealand Government as an alternate design for the New Zealand Flag in 2015.

A Silver fern flag designed by Kyle Lockwood. It won a Wellington newspaper flag competition in July 2004 and appeared on TV3 in 2005 after winning a poll which included the present national flag. It was voted on in the 2015 referendum.

Silver Fern (Black & White) by Alofi Kanter was voted on in the 2015 referendum.

== See also ==
- List of New Zealand flags
- New Zealand flag debate
