= Lockwood's sign =

- Differential diagnosis: Crohn's disease or chronic appendicitis

Lockwood's sign is a medical sign that indicates Crohn's disease and/or chronic appendicitis. This sign is named after the English surgeon and anatomist, Charles Barrett Lockwood, who stated that:

"The patient lies on his back with his head raised on a pillow and his knees drawn up, so that the superficial abdominal muscles are relaxed. The surgeon sits down near his right side and palpates the right iliac region near McBurney's spot with the three inner fingers of his left hand. If he feels a trickle of flatulence passing his fingers and if this can be often repeated after waiting a half to one minute, or a little longer, the patient has either a chronically inflamed appendix or adhesions near it."
