= Suprachoroid lamina =

Details

Identifiers
- Latin: lamina suprachorioidea
- TA98: A15.2.03.003
- FMA: 58368

The suprachoroid or suprachoroid lamina is a thin membrane forming part of the choroid of the eye. It lines the external surface of the choroid. It is composed of delicate non-vascular lamellae. The long and short ciliary nerves and the long posterior ciliary arteries pass anterior-ward within the suprachoroid lamina.

== Anatomy ==
=== Microanatomy ===
The lamellae of the suprachoroid lamina are composed of a network of fine collagen and elastic fibers, and of fibroblasts and melanocytes.

The spaces between the lamellae are lined by endothelium, and open freely into the perichoroidal lymph space, which, in its turn, communicates with the periscleral space by the perforations in the sclera through which the vessels and nerves are transmitted.

=== Development ===
During embryological development, it is derived from the neural crest.

== See also ==
- suprachoroidal drug delivery
