= Robert Paynswick =

Robert Paynswick was appointed Dean of Christ Church, Dublin by Henry VIII on 11 May 1541; and died in 1543.

Religious titles
Preceded by 1st dean	Dean of Christ Church Cathedral, Dublin; 1541– 1543	Succeeded by Thomas Lockwood
