= Tenon's capsule =

Membrane surrounding the eye forming a socket in which it moves

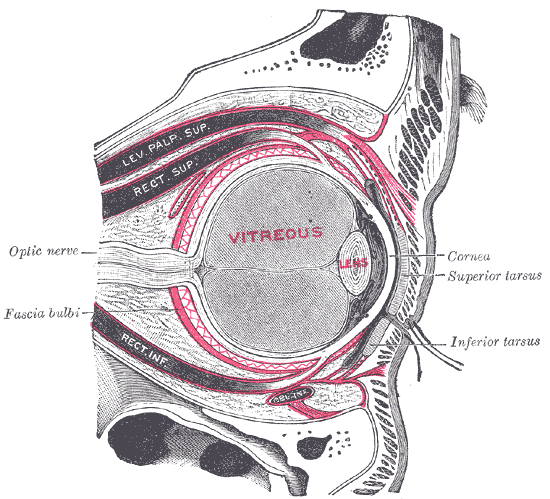
- The right eye in sagittal section, showing Tenon's capsule (semidiagrammatic).

Details
- Location: Orbit (anatomy)

Identifiers
- Latin: vagina bulbi, capsula Tenoni
- MeSH: D058475
- FMA: 58734

Tenon's capsule (/təˈnoʊn/), also known as the Tenon capsule, fascial sheath of the eyeball (Latin: vagina bulbi) or the fascia bulbi, is a thin membrane which envelops the eyeball from the optic nerve to the corneal limbus, separating it from the orbital fat and forming a socket in which it moves.

The inner surface of Tenon's capsule is smooth and is separated from the outer surface of the sclera by the periscleral lymph space. This lymph space is continuous with the subdural and subarachnoid cavities and is traversed by delicate bands of connective tissue which extend between the capsule and the sclera.

The capsule is perforated behind by the ciliary vessels and nerves and fuses with the sheath of the optic nerve and with the sclera around the entrance of the optic nerve. In front it adheres to the conjunctiva, and both structures are attached to the ciliary region of the eyeball.

The structure was named after Jacques-René Tenon (1724–1816), a French surgeon and pathologist.

== Structure ==
=== Relations ===
Tenon's capsule is perforated by the tendons of the ocular muscles and is reflected backward on each as a tubular sheath. The sheath of the obliquus superior is carried as far as the fibrous pulley of that muscle, and that on the obliquus inferior reaches as far as the floor of the orbit, to which it gives off a slip. The sheaths on the recti muscles are gradually lost in the perimysium, but they give off important expansions. The expansion from the rectus superior blends with the tendon of the levator palpebrae, and that of the rectus inferior is attached to the inferior tarsus; it is the space which lies between the sclera and the capsule. The expansions from the sheaths of the recti lateralis and medialis are strong, especially that from the latter muscle, and are attached to the zygomatic bone and lacrimal bone respectively; as they probably check the actions of these two recti, they have been named the medial and lateral check ligaments.

Charles Barrett Lockwood described a thickening of the lower part of Tenon's capsule, which he named the suspensory ligament of the eye. It is slung like a hammock below the eyeball, being expanded in the center, and narrow at its extremities which are attached to the zygomatic and lacrimal bones respectively.

== Clinical significance ==
=== Inflammation ===
Tenon's capsule may be affected by a disease called idiopathic orbital inflammation, a condition of unknown etiology that is characterized by inflammation of one or more layers of the eye. The disease is also known as orbital inflammatory pseudotumor, and sometimes may only affect the lacrimal gland or the extraocular muscles.

=== Local anaesthesia ===
Local anaesthetic may be instilled into the space between Tenon's capsule and the sclera to provide anaesthesia for eye surgery, principally cataract surgery. After applying local anaesthetic drops to anaesthetise the conjunctiva, a small fold of conjunctiva is lifted off the eyeball and an incision made. A blunt, curved cannula is passed through the incision into the periscleral lymph space and a volume of local anaesthetic solution is instilled. The advantages are a reduced risk of bleeding and of penetration of the globe, compared to peribulbar and retrobulbar approaches. Akinesia (paralysis of the external eye muscles) may be less complete, however.
