= William Lockwood =

William, Will, Bill, or Billy Lockwood may refer to:

- Bill Lockwood (cricketer) (1868–1932), English cricketer
- Will Lockwood (ice hockey) (born 1998), American ice hockey player
- Will Lockwood (rower) (born 1988), Australian rower
- William Lockwood (Australian cricketer) (1868–1953), Australian cricketer
- William Lockwood (MP), Member of Parliament for Scarborough in the 1540s
- William Burley Lockwood (1917–2012), British academic
- William W. Lockwood (1906–1978), American academic
