= Michael Lockwood =

Michael Lockwood may refer to:

- Michael Lockwood (philosopher) (died 2018), British philosopher
- Mike Lockwood (physicist) (born 1954), British physicist
- Michael Lockwood (public servant) (born 1959), British public servant and local government officer
- Michael Lockwood (guitarist) (born 1961), American guitarist and producer
- Crash Holly (Michael Lockwood, 1971–2003), American professional wrestler
