= Independent Office for Police Conduct =

Police oversight organisation in England and Wales

- Abbreviation: IOPC
- Predecessor: Independent Police Complaints Commission
- Formation: 8 January 2018
- Legal status: Non-departmental public body
- Purpose: Complaints about the English and Welsh police forces
- Region served: England and Wales
- Director General: Rachel Watson
- Parent organisation: Home Office
- Budget: £71.5 million (Note: Grant by Home Office in annual report due to the lack of a single number) (2020)
- Staff: 1,012 (Note: excludes SCS grade staff and non-executive directors) (2020)
- Website: policeconduct.gov.uk

The Independent Office for Police Conduct (IOPC) is a non-departmental public body in England and Wales, responsible for overseeing the system for handling complaints made against police forces in England and Wales. It replaced the Independent Police Complaints Commission in 2018.

== Referrals ==
Most allegations of police misconduct are investigated by police forces' own professional standards departments (with oversight by the IOPC). The IOPC also conducts independent investigations of serious allegations of misconduct or criminal offences by police officers and other law enforcement officers. 'Mandatory' referrals are usually made to the IOPC should a person die or sustain serious injuries following police contact. Additionally, a force's professional standards department may also make a 'voluntary' referral – in which a force will ask the IOPC to consider if they wish to investigate independently, supervise a force professional standards investigation, or decline and refer the investigation back to the force to investigate without any IOPC input. The office received over 4300 referrals from police forces and completed about 700 investigations in the 2019/20 year.

== Structure ==
The functions of the Independent Office for Police Conduct were previously undertaken by the Independent Police Complaints Commission (IPCC), which was established in 2004 and abolished upon the creation of the IOPC.

The Independent Office for Police Conduct originated from the Policing and Crime Act 2017 and unlike its IPCC predecessor, does not have a commission structure and is headed by a director general, supported by deputies, regional directors and a director for Wales. The first director general of the Independent Office for Police Conduct was Michael Lockwood, previously Chief Executive of Harrow London Borough Council.

== Additional powers ==
The Policing and Crime Act 2017 furnished the Independent Office for Police Conduct with powers which the IPCC did not have:

- a power to initiate its own investigations without relying on a force to record and refer
- powers to determine appeals and recommend remedies
- a shortened process for deciding whether a case should go to a disciplinary hearing

In April 2017, the IPCC took over responsibility of oversight of complaints in relation to the Gangmasters and Labour Abuse Authority and from 2018, the new Independent Office for Police Conduct, in certain circumstances, takes responsibility for oversight of complaints in relation to fire and rescue service personnel.

== 2022 Parliamentary report ==
A report of the Home Affairs Select Committee in the House of Commons published on 1 March 2022 found that bad communications and lack of transparency were damaging complainants and officers. The report said that the public has little confidence that complaints would succeed or that officers guilty of misconduct would be sanctioned appropriately. Delays are too long, the report stated, “There needs to be a change of culture in police forces. It should not be necessary to compel officers to cooperate with investigations. This culture change must be from top to bottom to ensure that complaints are handled quickly and openly, delivering punishment for misconduct where necessary and clearing officers who have not committed an offence.” Operation Midland had left complainants “feeling let down by a system failing to treat their complaints with the severity they merited”. Other complainants felt similarly let down.

== Resignation of Michael Lockwood ==
In December 2022, Michael Lockwood resigned from his position as IOPC director general due to his being subject to a police investigation. He said this was for "personal and domestic reasons". Suella Braverman, then Home Secretary, said that she had asked him to either resign or be suspended, because of a historical allegation. In July 2024, a jury found Lockwood not guilty of all charges.

== To Catch a Copper television series ==
In January 2024, Channel 4 aired a 3-episode mini-series, To Catch a Copper, focused on the Counter-Corruption Unit of the Avon and Somerset Police. The episodes featured a serving officer being arrested for suspected revenge porn, a man subject to a stop and search, and a woman arrested on a bus. Officers can be seen attempting to restrain the woman, who was carrying her child. The IOPC was consulted in some cases to decide if there was any grounds for a referral to the Crown Prosecution Service, and whether legal action should be taken.
