= Suprachoroidal drug delivery =

Ocular route of drug administration

Schematic diagram of the human eye showing sclera and choroid. The suprachoroidal space is located between these two layers.

Suprachoroidal drug delivery is an ocular route of drug administration. It involves using a microneedle to provide a minimally invasive method and injecting particles of a medication into the suprachoroidal space (SCS) between the sclera and choroid in the eye. Suprachoroidal drug delivery is a non-traditional approach for administering medication to the eye, leveraging a microneedle-based technique to achieve a minimally invasive method of injection. This process introduces drug particles directly into the suprachoroidal space (SCS), which is located between the sclera and the choroid. Unlike traditional ocular delivery routes, suprachoroidal administration offers several advantages, including reduced invasiveness and a lower risk of complications such as traumatic cataracts or retinal tears.

By targeting the SCS, this method allows drugs to bypass the various natural barriers of the eye—namely the blood-aqueous, outer blood-retinal, and inner blood-retinal barriers—that can limit the efficacy and penetration of therapeutic agents. This ability to navigate around these protective barriers significantly enhances the effectiveness of the drug, providing more direct and efficient delivery to the desired ocular tissues.

Microneedles, which are central to this delivery technique, can be utilized in different areas of the eye, but targeting the SCS is particularly critical. The SCS plays a key role in maintaining intraocular pressure, making it a prime location for therapeutic intervention. Microneedle devices can be precisely engineered and customized to meet specific therapeutic needs, offering a high degree of flexibility and control. Notably, microneedle-based drug delivery has been shown to increase the amount of drug delivered to the eye by up to 60 times when compared to traditional topical applications. Their ability to deliver drugs efficiently into the eye makes them a compelling choice for non-invasive treatment options, and ongoing developments continue to refine their application in ocular therapies. Diseases like macular degeneration (AMD), diabetic retinopathy, and glaucoma all have the potential to be alleviated by using microneedle delivery.

== Suprachoroidal space ==
The suprachoroidal space (SCS) is a potential anatomical space situated between the sclera and the choroid, typically collapsed under normal physiological conditions due to intraocular pressure (IOP) and the presence of collagenous fibers that anchor the sclera to the choroid. Despite its collapsed state, the SCS plays an important physiological role in maintaining intraocular pressure and supporting fluid drainage through pathways such as the uveoscleral outflow. In recent years, the SCS has gained attention as a strategic site for ocular drug delivery, especially for targeting diseases of the posterior segment of the eye, including age-related macular degeneration, diabetic retinopathy, and uveitis.

Because the SCS lies adjacent to the highly vascular choroid and near the retina, it offers direct access to posterior ocular tissues, making it an ideal route for localized treatment. Therapeutics administered into the SCS can be delivered more precisely, often requiring lower doses than traditional routes such as intravitreal or systemic administration, while achieving equivalent or enhanced therapeutic effects. Furthermore, drugs remain compartmentalized within the SCS, reducing exposure to non-target tissues in the anterior segment of the eye. This localized containment minimizes the risk of side effects, such as cataract formation or increased IOP, which are more commonly associated with conventional therapies.

Additionally, the SCS can be accessed using minimally invasive microneedle technology, allowing for repeatable and controlled administration with reduced patient discomfort and fewer complications compared to subretinal surgery. As a result, the SCS is emerging not only as a valuable target for delivering small molecules, corticosteroids, and gene therapies but also as a potential biomarker for disease activity, particularly in conditions involving inflammation or choroidal congestion. With continued advancements in imaging and injection techniques, the suprachoroidal space holds promise for transforming the landscape of posterior segment ocular therapies.

== Traditional routes of ocular drug delivery ==
Drug delivery to the suprachoroidal space can be achieved through a variety of advanced techniques, each offering distinct advantages and challenges. One of the most commonly used methods involves topical applications, such as eye drops. While convenient, this approach suffers from limited efficiency in drug delivery, particularly when compared to more sophisticated techniques like microcatheters, nanoparticles, and microneedles.

Microcatheters, for instance, provide the ability to precisely target and directly visualize the delivery of therapeutic agents into the SCS. However, this method is not without its drawbacks, as it carries certain risks and demands a high level of expertise from the operator. The delicate nature of the procedure and the potential for complications make it a less favorable option for some patients.

Research into nanoparticle-based drug delivery is actively underway, with several studies in the early stages of exploration. Nanoparticles hold significant promise due to their ability to enhance the stability and bioavailability of drugs, as well as their potential for more efficient and targeted delivery. While the field is still in its infancy, the growing body of research offers future prospects for the future of ocular therapy.

== Types of microneedles used in ocular drug delivery ==
=== Coated microneedles ===
Coated microneedles offer a minimally invasive method to deliver drugs to the eye. In this method, stainless steel microneedles (500-750 um long) are coated with a variety of compounds (fluorescein, pilocarpine, proteins, and DNA) using a dip-coating method. Upon insertion into the eye tissue, these coatings quickly dissolve and deliver their payload within 30 seconds to the sclera tissue Coated microneedles leave no structural damage to the surrounding tissue or leave any coating residue that would potentially affect efficacy.

One study involving fluorescein-coated microneedles delivered 60x higher drug concentrations to the anterior chamber of the eye compared to standard eye drops. Additionally, pilocarpine-coated microneedles were able to constrict pupils faster than equivalent topical medications, proving that coated microneedles can deliver bioactive compounds effectively compared to the traditional routes of ocular drug delivery.

The safety profile of coated microneedles offer no measurable inflammatory response, tissue damage, or microneedle breakage, which indicate that this delivery method is safe for ocular use. The localized delivery of coated microneedles enables precise and targeted delivery to the anterior and posterior segments of the eye without systemic side effects or intraocular injections.

=== Dissolvable microneedles ===
Dissolvable microneedles allow for another way for delivering drugs, particularly macromolecules, into the eye through intracorneal and intrascleral routes. Polyvinylpyrrolidone (PVP) is used to make dissolving polymeric microneedles. PVP is non-toxic to retinal cells at therapeutic concentrations, which is essential for this delivery to be effective.

One study found that manufacturing PVP into dissolvable microneedles around 800 um tall allowed for mechanically strong microneedles that can penetrate corneal and scleral tissues. The PVP MNs rapidly dissolved within 10 to 180 seconds and formed drug depots within the ocular tissue. When compared to the standard eye drop, dissolvable microneedles were seen to significantly improve the permeation of macromolecules and drugs with high molecular weights across ocular tissues and enabled sustained drug release, which is beneficial for treating conditions such as choroidal neovascularization (CNV) and age-related macular degeneration (AMD).

In another study, hyaluronic acid microneedles were combined with a cryogel, which allowed them to prolong release of the drug. This technology provides a more painless, non-invasive, and biodegradable delivery system. The anti-inflammatory properties of hyaluronic acid also further solidify that this delivery system can be tuned to fit a variety of illnesses.

Dissolving microneedles have the ability to overcome major barriers for large drug molecules that cannot pass through corneal or scleral barriers. Once again, the microneedle formulation offers a safe and minimally invasive approach to ocular drug delivery where there is reduced need for repeated injections or systemic dosing with dissolvable microneedles. This method contrasts with other forms of microneedle drug formulations such as avoiding the complications with solid or hollow microneedles being brittle and leading to drug waste.

=== Microneedle arrays ===
Arrays of microneedles are another method of ocular drug delivery. This technology features a grid of microneedles that are carefully designed to fit in the more confined parts of the eye. Overall, microneedle arrays demonstrate a more consistent drug release profile than their single-needle counterparts. When the release rates of eight, twelve, and sixteen microneedle arrays were tested over a four-week period, the 8- and 12- needle arrays showed the steadiest release rate. It is predicted that the 8-needle model could deliver a drug consistently for 6 weeks.

== Microneedle Manufacturing Methods ==
There are a variety of ways to manufacture microneedles for drug use depending on the type of microneedle itself. In order to be used for clinical drug use, microneedle manufacturing must be done sterilely, meet regulatory compliance, pass quality control tests, and maintain batch consistency throughout the entire manufacturing process.

=== Coated microneedles ===
Coated microneedles are commonly scaled up through dip coating or spray coating processes. First, the microneedles are mass-produced through microfabrication such as laser cutting stainless steel or silicon wafers. Automated dip-coaters or precision spray-coating devices are able to control the viscosity and surface tension of the coating solution to ensure uniform coverage of the microneedles. These high-throughput systems allow for thousands of microneedles to be coated evenly in minutes. Once the microneedles are drug-coated, they must dry under controlled temperature and humidity to ensure coating adherence.

Scaling up of drug-coated microneedles is compatible to incorporate into existing transdermal microneedle production lines. The relatively low material cost that coated microneedles offer in addition to their shorter manufacturing cycle times compared to dissolvable or hollow microneedles.

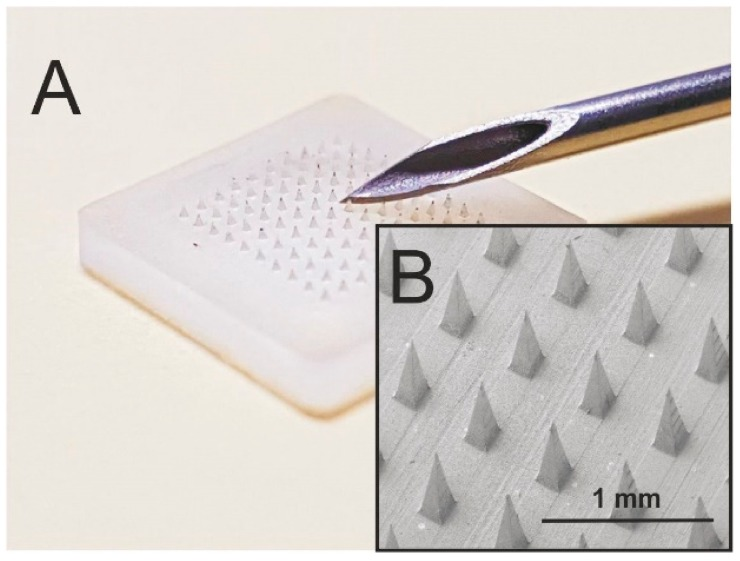
(A) Comparison between hypodermic needle and microneedle. (B) Magnification of microneedle.

=== Dissolvable microneedles ===
Dissolvable microneedles are made with water-soluble polymers such as PVP or hyaluronic acid. First, the drug-loaded polymer gel must be prepared aseptically. The mold filling of the microneedles is done with high throughput systems such as automated dispensers or centrifugal casting. The drug-filled needle tips are cast first, followed by a mechanical baseplate polymer. Once the microneedles are created, they go through similar drying and curing processes to the manufacturing methods of coated microneedles, such as vacuum drying. After drying, the demolding and assembly of the microneedles is done into the application format they will be used for ocular drug delivery.

The manufacturing methods of dissolvable microneedles allows for the elimination of sharps waste, which other drug formulations often have. It is important to maintain moisture sensitivity during production and storage for the microneedles to keep their physical and mechanical drug loading properties.

=== Hollow microneedles ===
Hollow microneedles are made from silicon, glass, or metal such as stainless steel or titanium. Laser micro-drilling or deep reactive ion etching (DRIE) are the manufacturing tools used to fabricate the hollow microneedles onto wafers and then separated into arrays or single-use units depending on the usage. The hollow microneedles are coupled with microfluidic pumps or syringes to allow for precise dosing of the drug content.

This process is more complex compared to other microneedle manufacturing methods, in addition to the high cost of materials and risk associated with microneedle brittleness.

== Applications to disease ==
Suprachoroidal space drug delivery has been found to alleviate a variety of illnesses and diseases in the eye. Macular degeneration (AMD), diabetic retinopathy, and glaucoma can be more effectively treated with microneedles in the SCS when compared to traditional topical applications.

AMD is characterized by a loss of vision due to cellular debris or increased growth of blood vessels, depending on the type of AMD. This disease is treated through an injection of anti-VEGF medication or corticosteroids into the SCS. Diabetic retinopathy is a condition associated with retina damage that eventually can lead to blindness. Long-term, noninvasive treatment is required to treat this condition, which microneedles provide. Glaucoma is a group of eye diseases that ultimately lead to optic nerve damage and possibly blindness. High intraocular pressure (IOP) is a risk factor for glaucoma, so microneedles have been used to precisely deliver IOP-lowering drugs into the SCS. The use of the suprachoroidal space allows the medication to bypass the conventional trabecular outflow pathways.

There are many applications of this delivery technique that are currently being created, however, there is only one FDA approved medication (XIPERE) that specifically administers a medication through injection to the suprachoroidal space. XIPERE is a steroid that is used to treat macular edema associated with noninfectious uveitis.

== Future scope ==
Currently, there are clinical trials underway to assess the efficacy of gene therapies and slow-release drugs for various retinal conditions when administered to the suprachoroidal space. The SCS has demonstrated that it has a greater coverage of gene transfer across the eye, which could make it a target location for specified gene therapies. One study reviewed the results of clinical trials for retinal gene therapies and found that the four most promising therapies are for "achromatopsia, XLRP (RPGR gene mutations), nAMD (inhibition of VEGF function), and LHON (ND4 gene mutations)."

Achromatopsia is caused by mutations in cone-specific genes like CNGB3 and CNGA3, leading to color blindness, low visual acuity, and light sensitivity. AAV-based gene therapies delivered via subretinal injection have shown improved cone function in clinical trials. Treatments were generally well-tolerated, though mild immune responses occurred at higher doses. X-linked retinitis pigmentosa (XLRP) is commonly linked to retinitis pigmentosa GTPase regulator (RPGR) mutations, affecting rod photoreceptors first. Gene therapy trials using AAV vectors have demonstrated safety and early signs of visual improvement. Some inflammation was seen, but was ultimately manageable with corticosteroids. The new trials for this therapy are aiming to confirm long-term benefits. Neovascular AMD (nAMD) involves abnormal retinal blood vessel growth due to VEGF activity. Gene therapies using AAV vectors aim to provide sustained VEGF inhibition, reducing the need for frequent injections. Early trials with intravitreal and suprachoroidal delivery show stable vision and fewer injections, with mild side effects. Leber hereditary optic neuropathy (LHON) results from ND4 mitochondrial mutations, causing rapid vision loss. AAV-mediated gene therapy has shown promising results, with vision improvements even in untreated eyes. Clinical trials report good safety, and the therapy is nearing potential approval.

== See also ==
- Suprachoroid lamina
