= Suspensory ligament of eyeball =

Ligament of the eye

Details

Identifiers
- Latin: ligamentum suspensorium bulbi
- TA98: A15.2.07.005
- TA2: 6818

The suspensory ligament of eyeball (or Lockwood's ligament) forms a hammock stretching below the eyeball between the medial and lateral check ligaments and enclosing the inferior rectus and inferior oblique muscles of the eye. It is a thickening of Tenon's capsule, the dense connective tissue capsule surrounding the globe and separating it from orbital fat.

This ligament is responsible for maintaining and supporting the position of the eyeball in its normal upward and forward position within the orbit, and prevents downward displacement of the eyeball.

It can be considered a part of the bulbar sheath.

It is named for Charles Barrett Lockwood.
