= Kyle Lockwood =

New Zealand architect (born 1977)

Kyle Lockwood JP
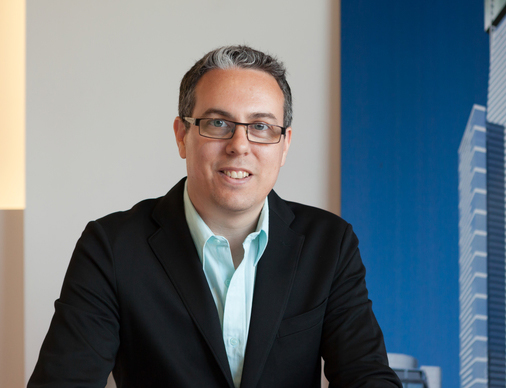
- Lockwood in 2015
- Born: 1977 (age 48–49); Wellington, New Zealand
- Education: Massey University
- Occupation: Architectural designer Justice of the Peace
- Known for: Flag designs; 18+ card; 10-year passport campaign
- Notable work: Lockwood silver fern flag; Petition of Kyle Lockwood
- Military career
- Allegiance: New Zealand
- Branch: New Zealand Army
- Service years: 1995–1996
- Rank: Private
- Website: kyle-lockwood.com

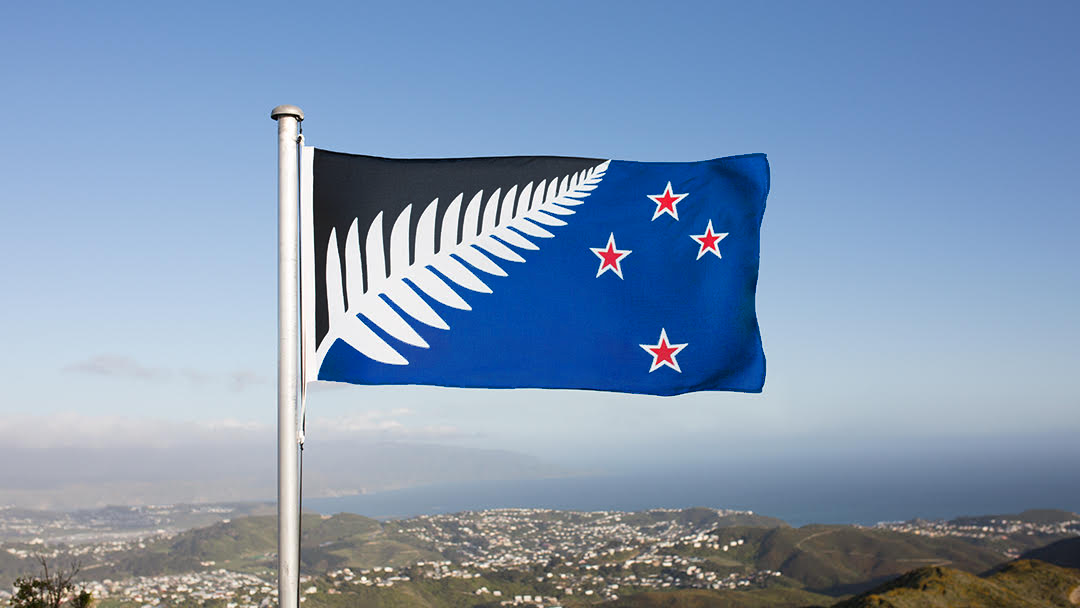
Lockwood's silver fern flag over Wellington, New Zealand's capital city

Kyle Simon Lockwood JP (born 1977) is a New Zealand architectural designer and public activist based in Melbourne, Australia. He is known for leading the successful campaign for the New Zealand Government to reintroduce the duration of the New Zealand passport to ten years, and for designing the two flags that came first and second, in the first New Zealand flag referendum. He also successfully lobbied for the introduction of the popular 18+ (now Kiwi Access) card.

Lockwood's Silver Fern Flag design was voted in as the official Preferred Alternative New Zealand Flag in the first referendum, in March 2016 the existing Flag of New Zealand won the second referendum.

Since December 2020, Lockwood has served as a Justice of the Peace in the state of Victoria.

== Early life ==
Lockwood was born in 1977 in Wellington, New Zealand. His father, Simon Lockwood, represented New Zealand in underwater hockey, and was team captain. As the team used the silver fern as their symbol, Lockwood grew fond of this symbol. His mother is Barbara Lockwood. He is descended from Ngāti Porou ki Hauraki Māori. His early life was also influenced by his grandparents, Kathy and Walter Lockwood, who were both born in the United Kingdom, and served in the Royal Navy and the Royal Air Force respectively. During World War Two, Walter Lockwood served as a Chindit behind Japanese enemy lines in Burma. Kyle attended Lyall Bay School and Evans Bay Intermediate School in the Wellington suburb of Kilbirnie. After high school at Rongotai College, he volunteered in the New Zealand Army before working for the Wellington City Council for four years in the building consent department. In 1999 he attended Massey University and studied architectural technology, graduating in 2001.

== Flag designs ==
Lockwood's silver fern flag design, voted first in the first New Zealand flag referendum

In one of the lectures at Massey University, the topic of attaching flagpoles to buildings came up, and Lockwood started sketching a flag. He considered a Union Jack but thought that a silver fern was more appropriate, and added the Southern Cross from the current New Zealand flag. Lockwood put the design away and published it about three years later in 2003. The flag design won a competition in July 2004 run by The Hutt News. The flag appeared on Campbell Live in 2005 and won an online poll that included the present national flag. In January 2014, then Prime Minister, John Key, announced that a binding flag referendum could be held with in conjunction with the 2014 general election. Whilst the date for the September 2014 election was missed, the New Zealand flag referendums went ahead and five of Lockwood's flags made it into an initial long list of 40 flags. Despite a UMR poll predicting a vote of 35%, the Silver Fern Flag gained a significant minority in the second referendum with 43.2% of the vote, whilst the existing flag won with 56.6% of the vote.

After the second referendum, the flag continued to make appearances in the International media. In the first New Zealand cricket test against Zimbabwe on 28 July 2016, the flag was featured in the opening graphics sequence, The flag is also still seen flying from flagpoles around New Zealand; Kip Colvey a prominent US/NZ football player, appeared in Fairfax media on 26 December 2016, in front of the flag.

Lockwood's silver fern design featured in the prototype livery of the 'Electron' rocket in Rocket Lab's New Zealand space program, The first Electron rocket was launched in 2017. The silver fern design is also featured in the New Zealand Walk of Fame in Orewa, Auckland, which was originally dedicated in September 2016. The design was also used after New Zealand's victory in the America's Cup, to welcome Pete Burling, and his Emirates Team New Zealand, at victory parades which were held in New Zealand's main cities throughout July 2017.

== Passport campaign ==
In November 2005, when the New Zealand Government reduced the validity of the New Zealand passport from ten years to five, the move was unpopular with the New Zealand travelling public. Lockwood's interest in the matter was raised when he witnessed a young mother refused travel for herself and her child because there were less than six months left on the mother's five-year passport. Lockwood set up a Facebook page called "Bring Back 10 Year NZ Passports" in January 2013 and a website nzten.com, which attracted much attention. The media picked up on the initiative during January 2013 and the first article appeared in Fairfax Media on 20 January.

The group submitted the Petition of Kyle Lockwood with 15,900 signatures to parliament on 4 December 2013. Prior to the 2014 general election Lockwood successfully negotiated with all main political parties to adopt a 10-year passport policy. The then prime minister, John Key, gave his first indication that a return to a 10-year validity period could be considered, in May 2014. An official review of the validity period was announced in August 2014, a month before the general election. Law changes were passed, and after 30 November 2015, 10-year passports were available again for New Zealanders.

Lockwood is regularly interviewed by media regarding passport matters, in January 2021, the Dominion Post asked whether he supported recommendations that passports be renewed in pandemic settings, Lockwood suggested that some sort of a discount should be offered by Government, as an incentive to renew, before an inevitable rush on passports occurred once borders were opened for international travel. Lockwood was also interviewed by Newshub on 9 September 2022 after the death of Queen Elizabeth II, as there was concern that passport validity may be affected due to NZ passports being issued in the name of Her Majesty, Lockwood commented that passport validity will not be affected.

== 18+ card campaign ==
In 1998 Lockwood successfully campaigned the New Zealand Government for a photographic evidence of age card to be made available to those who do not possess a driver licence or passport. At the time driver licences in New Zealand did not include a photograph and the legal age to purchase alcohol in New Zealand was 20 (or 18 if accompanied by a parent) Lockwood noted that many young New Zealanders who appeared to be under 25 were refused access to bars and clubs or could not purchase alcohol elsewhere unless they presented a valid passport.

Lockwood appeared before the Justice and Law Reform Parliamentary Select Committee on the Sale of Liquor Amendment Bill and argued that a photographic ID was necessary for those that do not hold a driver licence or passport. The committee recommended that an evidence of age card be made official and after the Sale of Liquor Amendment Act 1999 was gazetted the Hospitality NZ 18+ Card Evidence of Age Document was made available to New Zealanders and overseas citizens alike who do not wish to use a passport to purchase alcohol in New Zealand.

While originally developed as a means for younger people to prove they were over 18, the card grew in popularity amongst older people who do not have a driver licence or passport, who were looking for a cost-effective, nationally recognised form of photo ID. In recognition of the growing popularity of the 18+ card, and to better facilitate access to goods and services for everyone, across all sections of society in New Zealand, and to verify proof of age and identity throughout New Zealand, from 14 January 2019, the 18+ card was renamed the Kiwi Access Card.

== Justice of the Peace ==
In December 2020 Lockwood was appointed as a Justice of the Peace (JP) for Victoria by Governor Linda Dessau. In Victoria a JP is an honourable individual who has a commitment to provide honorary justice services, including certified copies, certifying true identity, witnessing statutory declarations and affidavits, and attesting powers of attorney for members of the community. Lockwood became a JP after finding there was a shortage of Justices of the Peace in his local area in Melbourne, his great-aunt also served as a JP in New South Wales.
