= Thomas Lockwood =

Thomas Lockwood may refer to:

- Thomas B. Lockwood (1873–1947), American lawyer, banker, politician, and philanthropist
- Thomas Meakin Lockwood (1830–1900), English architect
- Thomas William Lockwood (1863–?), English-born rugby union player for Wales
- Thomas Lockwood (priest) (died 1565), Archdeacon of Kells
- T. Firth Lockwood, Sr. (1868–1920), American architect
- T. Firth Lockwood, Jr. (1894–1963), American architect
