= Driver licence in New Zealand =

The New Zealand driver licence system is a graduated system that has been in place (with modifications, such as the L-plate requirement) since 1988. It consists of three phases for a car licence, each with varying levels of conditions.

== Overview ==
The New Zealand driver licence allows the holder to drive specified vehicles with or without restrictions on public roads and in public places. Upon passing the respective test for each stage of the system, the successful applicant is given a temporary paper licence to begin driving immediately while their permanent licence is printed and sent to them by post. The permanent licence contains a unique identifying number, date of birth and photograph of the holder. Drivers must carry their licence at all times while driving. If they fail to do so they may face an instant fine.

New Zealand driver licences are issued by Waka Kotahi, the NZ Transport Agency.

From 1925, local authorities issued driver licences, which were renewed each year when a completely new licence was issued. When the Ministry of Transport took over driver licensing, renewal was five-yearly from 1953 and a coupon was fastened inside the book at every renewal.

Apart from passports and a special-purpose 18+ card, a photo driver licence is the only legal form of identification for buying alcohol, tobacco and fireworks in New Zealand.

== Classes ==
The New Zealand driver licensing system is split into six classes of licence. Class 1 ("car licence") allows the driver to drive most cars, light vehicles, moped, tractor and all-terrain vehicles, while Class 6 ("motorcycle licence") allows the driver to ride a motorcycle. Classes 2, 3, 4, and 5 ("heavy vehicles licence") allow the driver to drive heavy vehicles of varying degrees according to the classes carried.

Classes 1 and 6 licences are able to be obtained on or after the driver's 16th birthday. Obtaining a Class 1 or Class 6 licence involves a three-tier stage system, starting with the learner licence, followed by the restricted licence, before finally obtaining the full licence. Classes 2 to 5 can be obtained only by a driver that carries a Class 1 full licence, and involves a two-tier stage system, missing out the restricted licence step.

- Class 1 (car) - a class 1 licence holder can drive any rigid or combination vehicle (other than a motorcycle) up to 6,000 kg gross combined weight (GCW). They may also drive a tractor up to 18,000 kg GCW and a tractor and trailer up to 25,000 kg GCW provided they are driven at a speed not exceeding 40 km/h.
- Class 2 (medium rigid) - To apply a class 2 licence, a person must have held a full class 1 licence for at least six months. A class 2 licence holder can drive any rigid vehicle (other than a motorcycle) up to 18,000 kg gross laden weight (GLW), including with a light trailer up to 3,500 kg. They may also drive a combination vehicle (i.e. with a trailer exceeding 3,500 kg) up to 12,000 kg GCW.
- Class 3 (medium combination) - To apply a class 3 licence, a person must have held a full class 2 licence for at least six months. A class 3 licence holder can drive any rigid vehicle (other than a motorcycle) up to 18,000 kg GLW, and any combination vehicle up to 25,000 kg GCW.
- Class 4 (heavy rigid) - To apply a class 4 licence, a person must have held a full class 2 licence for at least six months. A class 4 licence holder can drive any rigid vehicle (other than a motorcycle), including with a light trailer up to 3,500 kg. They may also drive a combination vehicle (i.e. with a trailer exceeding 3,500 kg) up to 12,000 kg GCW.
- Class 5 (heavy combination) - To apply a class 5 licence, a person must have held a full class 4 licence for at least six months. A class 5 licence holder can drive any rigid or combination vehicle (other than a motorcycle).
- Class 6 (motorcycle) - a class 6 licence holder can ride any motorcycle, including mopeds and all-terrain vehicles.

=== Endorsements ===
In addition to the six classes, driving some types of vehicles or services require licence endorsements. These can be gained once the appropriate course for the endorsement has been completed. Drivers applying for endorsements I, O, P and V also have to undergo a Police background check. Endorsements F, R, T, V and W are for driving the respective vehicles on a public road; the endorsements are not required if driven on private property that is not legally a "Public Place". A P endorsement is required only for taking paying passengers, not for driving the vehicle itself.

- D – dangerous goods
- F – forklifts
- I – driving instructor
- O – driver testing officer
- P – commercial passenger (e.g. taxi and bus drivers)
- R – vehicles running on rollers
- T – vehicles running on self-laying tracks
- V – vehicle recovery (e.g. tow-truck drivers)
- W – special-type vehicles running on wheels

== Stages for car and motorcycle licences ==
In 1999 plastic card licences replaced the plasticised paper licences. These needed to be renewed every 10 years, and featured a digital photo of the holder and a signature.

Newly styled licences similar to those in Europe were introduced as of 24 November 2014, coming into effect on 1 December 2014. Learner and Restricted licences are now issued for five years (previously ten) whereas full licences continue to be issued for ten years. This rule of licence renewal, however, changes after the person has reached their 75th birthday.

In mid-April 2025, Transport Minister Chris Bishop announced that the Government was planning to simplify the driving license system by replacing the full driving license test with a 18-month trial period and reducing the number of eyesight tests required. In early February 2026, Bishop confirmed that the Government would proceed with plans to eliminate the full driving test, institute a 6-12 month trial period for restricted drivers, lower licensing fees and reduce eyesight test requirements. These changes are expected to come into effect on 25 January 2027.

=== Learner Licence ===
A car learner licence is gained after scoring at least 32 out of 35 on a multiple-choice test relating to the Road Code. Once gained, it allows the holder to drive a car provided they display black-on-yellow learner plates and are accompanied by a "supervisor" (being any person who has a full New Zealand licence of the same class, and has had it or an equivalent overseas licence for at least two years). After having passed the test, the person will gain a temporary learner licence to use until they gain the photo learner licence.

A motorcycle learner licence is gained after passing a basic handling test and scoring at least 32 out of 35 on the theory test. Once gained, it allows the holder to ride a motorcycle provided they display a learner plate on the rear of their motorcycle, they do not ride with passengers or between the hours of 10:00 pm and 5:00 am, and they do not tow another vehicle. They must also only ride on a learner-approved motorcycle (LAMS); these motorcycles must have an engine displacement less than 660cc and a power-to-weight ratio of less than 150 kW per tonne (assuming the rider and their gear weighs 90 kg)

A heavy vehicle learner licence is gained after scoring at least 33 out of 35 on a multiple-choice test about the Road Code. There is a heavy vehicle test for classes 2, 3 and 5; the class 4 learner licence test is the same as the class 2 test and is only taken if the person does not hold a class 2 licence.

The learner licence is a blue plastic card and is issued to an applicant who passes the learner's test. The card is always the colour of the most restrictive licence, so a driver with a full Class 1 car licence and a learner Class 2 heavy vehicle licence will have a blue card.

=== Restricted Licence ===
When a driver has held their learner licence for six months, they are eligible to progress to a restricted licence, providing they meet the eyesight and medical requirements, and pass the restricted licence test.

Restricted car licence holders are permitted to drive on their own between the hours of 5 am and 10 pm, and allowed to carry specific passengers such as their long-term partner or spouse, parent, or child. If the licence holder is driving with a supervisor (a person who has held their full licence for a minimum of two years) seated in the front passenger seat, the night driving and passenger restrictions do not apply. Drivers who sat their restricted licence test in an automatic transmission car are only permitted to drive automatic transmission vehicles unless they have a supervisor with them.

Restricted motorcycle licence holders have the same restrictions as on their learner licence, except they no longer have to display learner plates.

The restricted licence is a yellow plastic card.

=== Full Licence ===
The final part of the licensing system, a full licence allows the holder to drive at any time and is normally issued without any other conditions. Restricted licence holders may apply for their full licence after holding their restricted licence for a period of 18 months, or 12 months if an approved defensive driving course has been completed (after six months of holding their licence). However, for drivers 25 years of age or older, the period that the restricted licence is held is six months or three months with an approved course having been completed. The practical, in-car test has a duration of 30 minutes. When the holder has held their full licence for two years, they are eligible to act as a supervisor for learner and restricted licence holders.

The full licence is a green plastic card. If a fully licensed driver is subject to court-ordered rules (e.g. a zero alcohol licence), the licence card is pink.

Full licences have to be renewed once every ten years until the driver is 75. Drivers must then renew their driver's licence on their 75th birthday, 80th birthday, and every second birthday after that.

== International ==
A New Zealand licence is valid for use for a limited period of time in many countries. An International Driving Permit (IDP) may be obtained from the Automobile Association. To obtain an IDP a person must be 18 years of age or over, hold a full current licence.

Visitors to New Zealand who hold overseas drivers licences may be required to take a driving test before they qualify for a full New Zealand licence. However, those from countries with similar road rules are only required to take a theory test (similar to the learner licence test) within a year of arrival or even simply convert their licence to a full New Zealand drivers licence for NZ$52.10 without any further tests (e.g. Germany); until this time they may continue to drive on their foreign drivers licence provided it is either written in English, or they have an authorised English translation available.

== Driving age concerns ==
Before 1 August 2011, someone could apply for a learner licence from the age of 15, and subsequently apply for a restricted licence by 15 and a half years of age, allowing unsupervised driving with certain restrictions, and finally a full licence by 16 and a half years of age. The minimum driver licensing age was raised by one year to 16 years of age since 1 August 2011, so the earliest someone can drive unsupervised is 16 and a half years of age. This change was initially met with opposition from people living in rural or remote areas. Many teenagers in rural areas learn to drive "on the farm" from the age of 12 by using farm equipment such as tractors. From a family day planning perspective, it is easier for students living in rural areas without access to public transport to drive themselves to school, when they become old enough to drive.

== Oldest licensed driver ==
At 107 as of 2019, New Zealand's oldest driver was Bob Moorfield.
