= Lynching of Charles Lockwood =

1886 lynching in the U.S. state of Connecticut

The lynching of Charles Lockwood took place on July 25, 1886, in Morris, Litchfield County in the U.S. state of Connecticut. Lockwood, a farmhand who had allegedly murdered a 16-year-old girl, was found hanging from a tree days after fleeing the scene of his alleged crime, while posses prowled the countryside searching for him. While the coroner attributed Lockwood's death to suicide, many sources consider his death a lynching.

A white man, Lockwood may have been the only lynching victim in the history of Connecticut and even of New England.

== Murder of Mattie Randall ==
Charles Lockwood was a farmhand who worked for Randall, a prosperous farmer newly established in the quiet country village of Morris, Connecticut. The New York Times described Lockwood as "a man of 35, short, but powerfully built, with sandy hair and a long, light mustache." Lockwood reportedly had served time both in county jail and state prison and was known to drink heavily at times. The newspapers labeled him "a man of low intelligence."

Lockwood became enamored with Mattie Randall, the 16-year-old daughter of his employer, a schoolteacher and regular attendee of the Congregationalist Sunday school. She was a popular, pretty girl whom the Hartford Courant called "the belle of the village." After Miss Randall spurned his advances and became engaged to another man, Lockwood became "dangerously jealous." The girl implored her father to fire Lockwood, but he remained employed. On the morning of Thursday, July 22, Lockwood asked Mattie to accompany him to the upper fields of the farm, where he said Mr. Randall wanted her to drive the hay rake. As they walked across an isolated stretch of the farm, Lockwood allegedly murdered her with a shotgun blast to the chest and fled into the woods, leaving his hat and gun behind. There were no eyewitnesses to the crime. Her father and brother discovered the victim in the early afternoon.

== Manhunt and hanging ==
After the discovery of Randall's body, hundreds of men, rising to fifteen hundred by the weekend, rapidly flooded in from Torrington, Litchfield, Thomaston, Watertown, and other neighboring towns to hunt down the murderer. Gun-toting posses blocked roads and scoured the countryside under the direction of Sheriff Champlain. Three days and two nights passed with little sign of Lockwood. The mood grew ugly, with many of the men heavily armed, without sleep for two days, and drunk on hard cider. Judge Huntington remarked that "my fear is that the countryside is wrought up that Lockwood may be shot on sight. But we want no lynchings in Connecticut." Finally, on Sunday, July 25, two boys discovered Lockwood's body hanging from a rope eight feet above the ground from the limb of a towering chestnut tree on the edge of the forest not far from the Randall farm, where the search had already passed. The medical examiner reported that death had occurred twelve hours earlier, at around midnight, though other accounts claimed that the body was still warm when found. Speculation held that Lockwood had hanged himself upon realizing that the cordon of searchers was drawn too tightly to escape.

On learning of Lockwood's death, a mob of three hundred men, yelling and brandishing guns and knives, stampeded up the hill toward the body. Guards prevented the mob from mutilating the body only with difficulty. The body was removed to a shed before being coffined and taken to Litchfield. Dissection was the body's likely fate. In the event that the deceased's father, William Lockwood, "does not take charge of it, and it is not supposed that he will, then the town will bury it, and bets are made that he will not be buried, but that some ambitious surgeon will have his skeleton in his own keeping."

Lockwood's body exhibited several non-lethal injuries, including a "burn as large as a teacup" and scorched clothing, evidently caused by a gunshot, on his chest. Newspapers speculated that the injury was caused by a suicide attempt or by an accidental discharge of the man's own shotgun. His throat showed a cut, possibly another suicide attempt from a broken knife allegedly found in Lockwood's effects. Lockwood had supposedly stolen food as well as the hanging rope from a barn owned by George Johnson, but the missing rope was not reported until Sunday morning after the body had been found.

Swarms of tourists descended on the area in the aftermath of Lockwood's death. They sought souvenirs such as the pansies Miss Randall had planted and pieces of bark from the tree on which Lockwood died. One woman even obtained a piece of his shirt. A local farmer sold the hanging rope for a dollar.

== Cause of death and debate ==
Public debate began as to whether Lockwood had been lynched or had hanged himself. On July 27, 1886, a jury of Litchfield County men empaneled by coroner J. B. Hardenburgh from North Canaan returned the verdict that Lockwood committed suicide. However, speculation was rife that a lynching had taken place. Opinion tended to break down along state lines, with out-of-state newspapers in Boston and New York arguing in favor of the lynching theory, whereas Connecticut-based papers declared in favor of the suicide theory. However, in January 1887, the Chicago Tribune published a list of lynchings in 1886 that included Lockwood's death, lending credence to the lynching theory. Writing in 1904, sociologist James Elbert Cutler rejected the suicide theory: "To a disinterested party, however, the evidence appears very strong in favor of the former view [that Lockwood was lynched]. ... In the writer's opinion, formed from reading various newspaper accounts of the occurrence, the Chicago Tribune rightly included Charles Lockwood in the list of persons lynched in the year 1886." The True Northerner, a Michigan newspaper, went so far as to claim that "Lockwood was tortured by being shot in the back, and then a negro plunged a knife through his neck; he was then strung up to a tree." More than forty years later, in 1928, the Hartford Courant published a long essay arguing that Lockwood had hanged himself and that Connecticut should be included "on [the] honor roll of lynch-less states."
