= Justice Lockwood =

Justice Lockwood may refer to:

- Alfred C. Lockwood (1875–1951), chief justice of the Arizona Supreme Court
- Lorna E. Lockwood (1903–1977), associate justice of the Arizona Supreme Court
- Samuel D. Lockwood (1789–1874), associate justice of the Illinois Supreme Court
- William F. Lockwood (1822–1901), associate justice of the Nebraska Supreme Court
