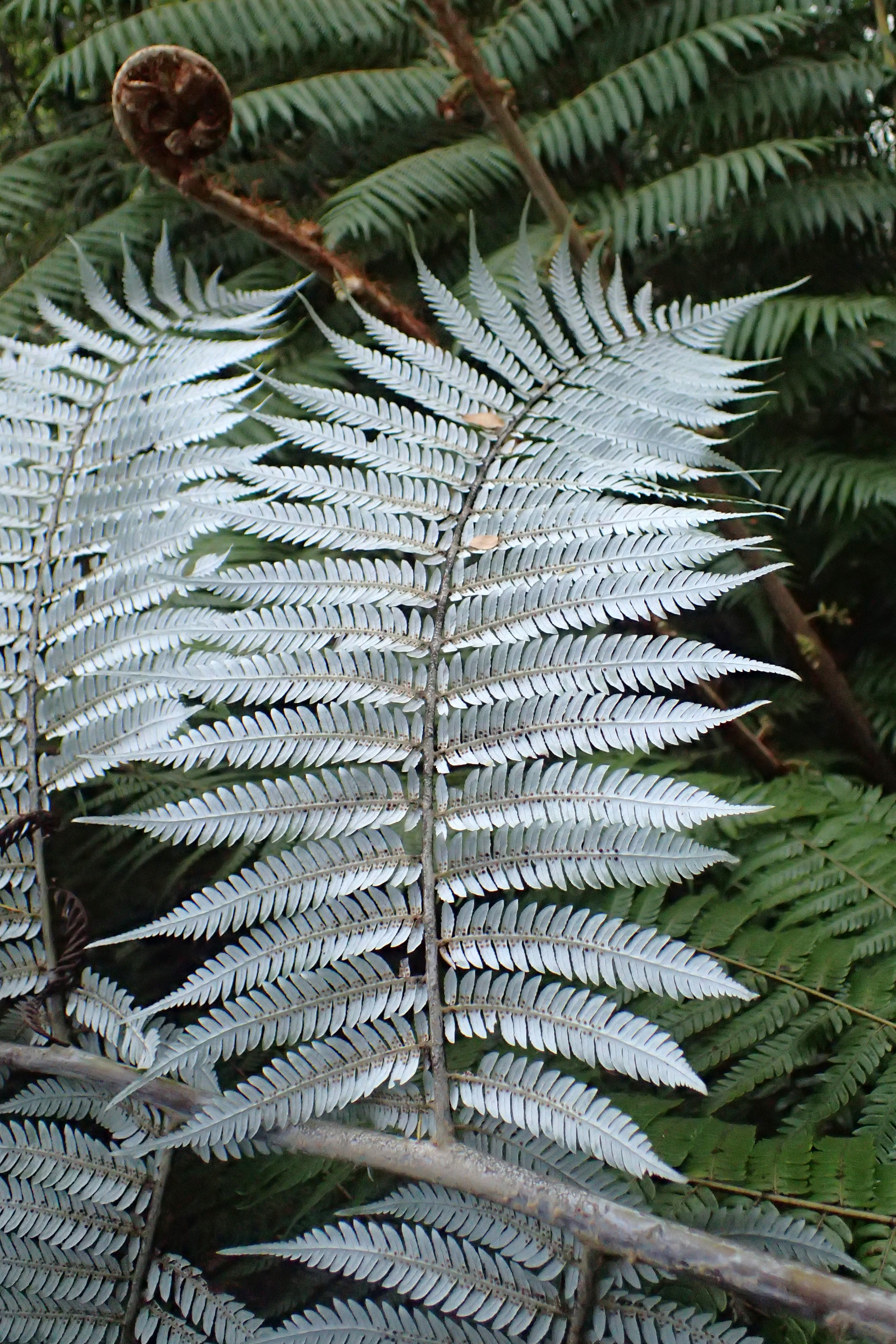
- Frond, showing the silver-white underside

Conservation status
- Not Threatened (NZ TCS)

Scientific classification
- Kingdom: Plantae
- Clade: Tracheophytes
- Division: Polypodiophyta
- Class: Polypodiopsida
- Order: Cyatheales
- Family: Cyatheaceae
- Genus: Alsophila
- Species: A. dealbata

Binomial name
- Alsophila dealbata (G.Forst.) Corda
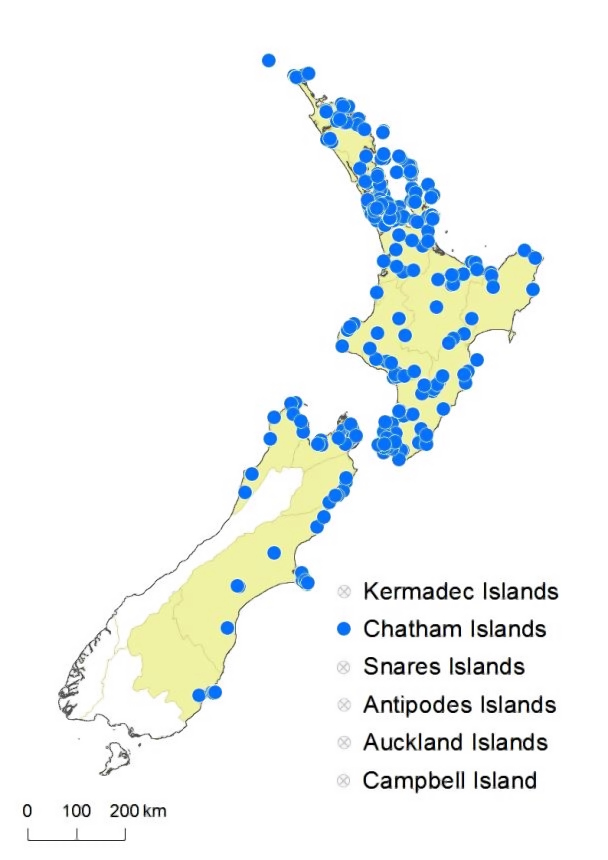

Synonyms
- Alsophila tricolor (Colenso) R.M.Tryon; Cyathea dealbata (G.Forst.) Sw.; Cyathea falciloba (Colenso) Domin; Cyathea tricolor Colenso; Hemitelia falciloba Colenso; Polypodium dealbatum G.Forst.

= Silver fern =

Species of medium-sized tree fern

Alsophila dealbata (synonyms Alsophila tricolor and Cyathea dealbata), commonly known as the silver fern or silver tree-fern, or as ponga /ˈpɒŋə/ or punga /ˈpʌŋə/ (from Māori kaponga or ponga), is a species of medium-sized tree fern, endemic to New Zealand. The fern is usually recognisable by the silver-white colour of the under-surface of mature fronds. It is a symbol commonly associated with the country both overseas and by New Zealanders themselves.

== Description ==
This fern is known to grow to heights of 10 metres (33 ft) or more (though it occasionally takes a rare creeping form). The crown is dense, and mature fronds can be as much as 3 metres (9.8 ft) long and 1 m (3 ft 3 in) wide with a silver-white colouration on the undersides. The fronds may be bipinnately compound or tripinnate. The underside colouration is less intensely silvery or patchy in younger plants and juveniles are pale green. This distinctive silver colouration has made them useful for laying along tracks for night walking. The scales are a dark brown and are often twisted and glossy. Rhizomes very rarely prostrate, usually erect, forming a woody trunk up to 12 metres (39 ft) tall, 160 to 450 millimetres (6.3 to 17.7 in) in diameter, covered in light brown or white projecting stipe bases, bearing scales near the apex.

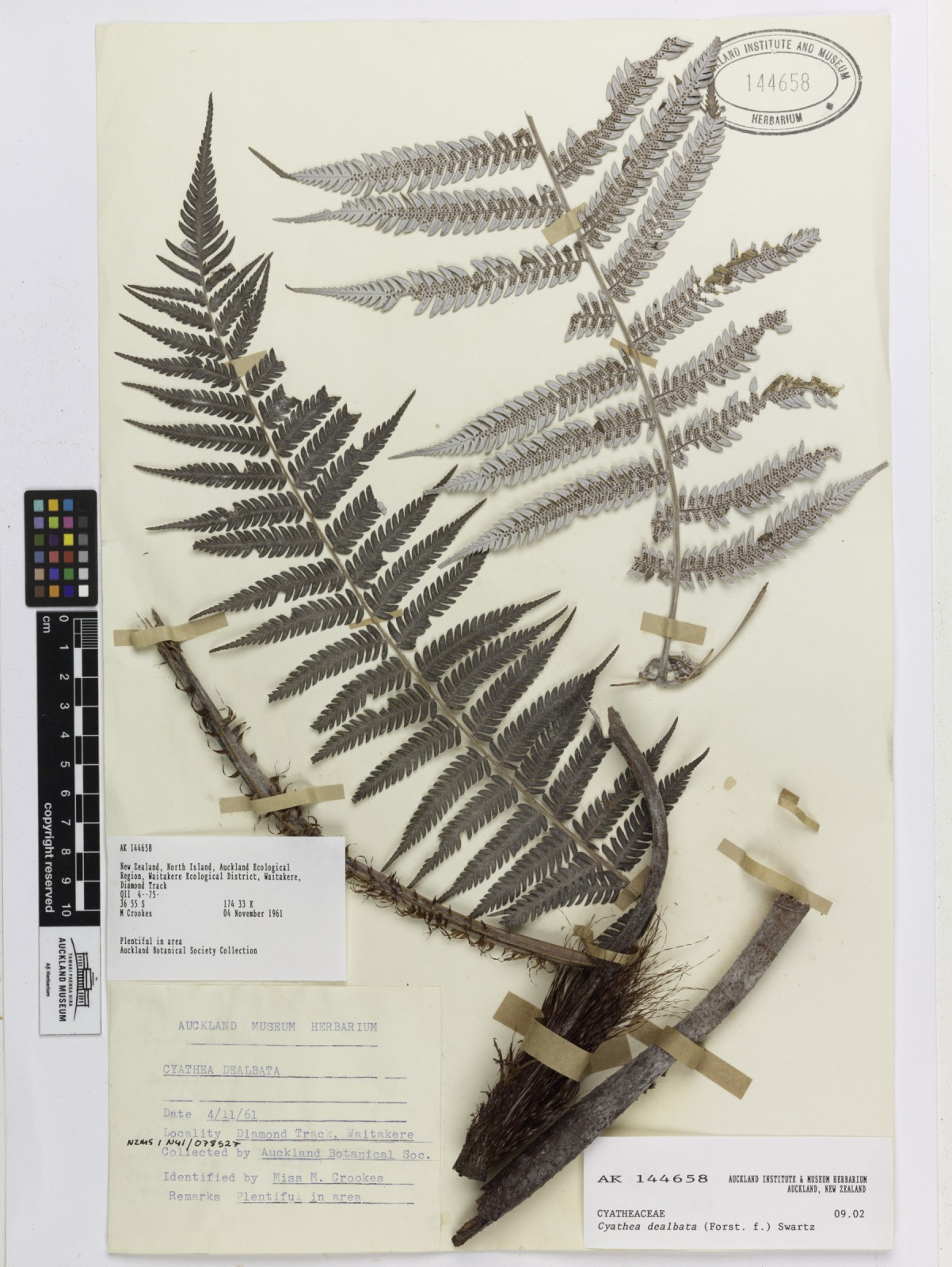
Herbarium specimen

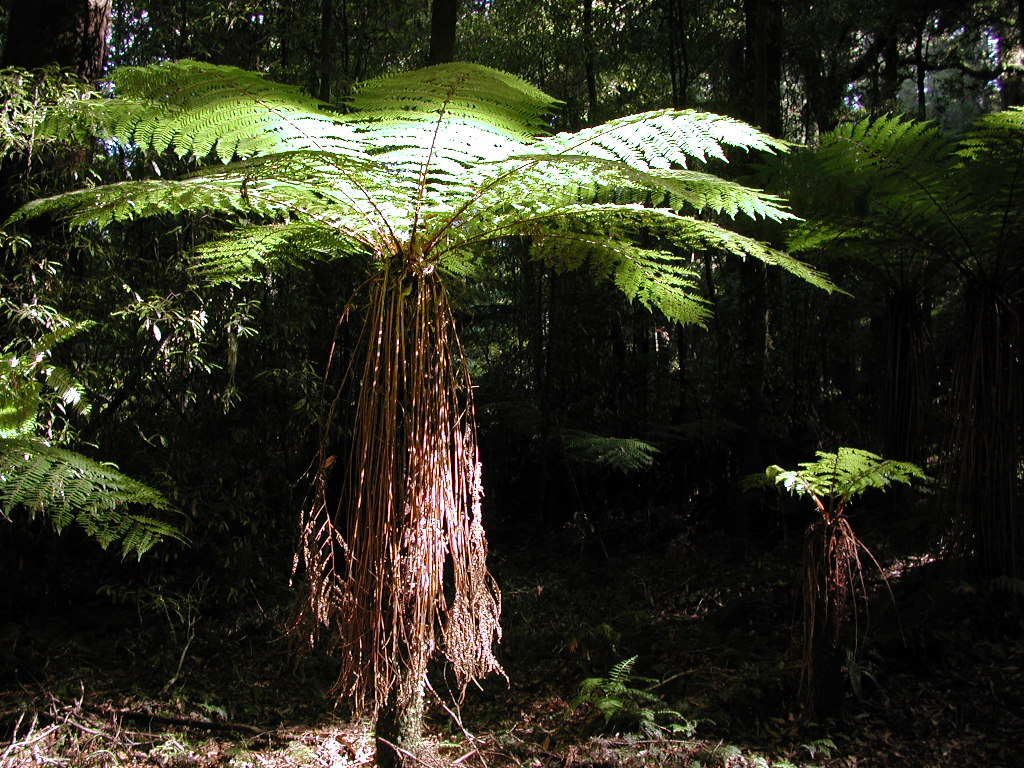
A sunlit silver fern

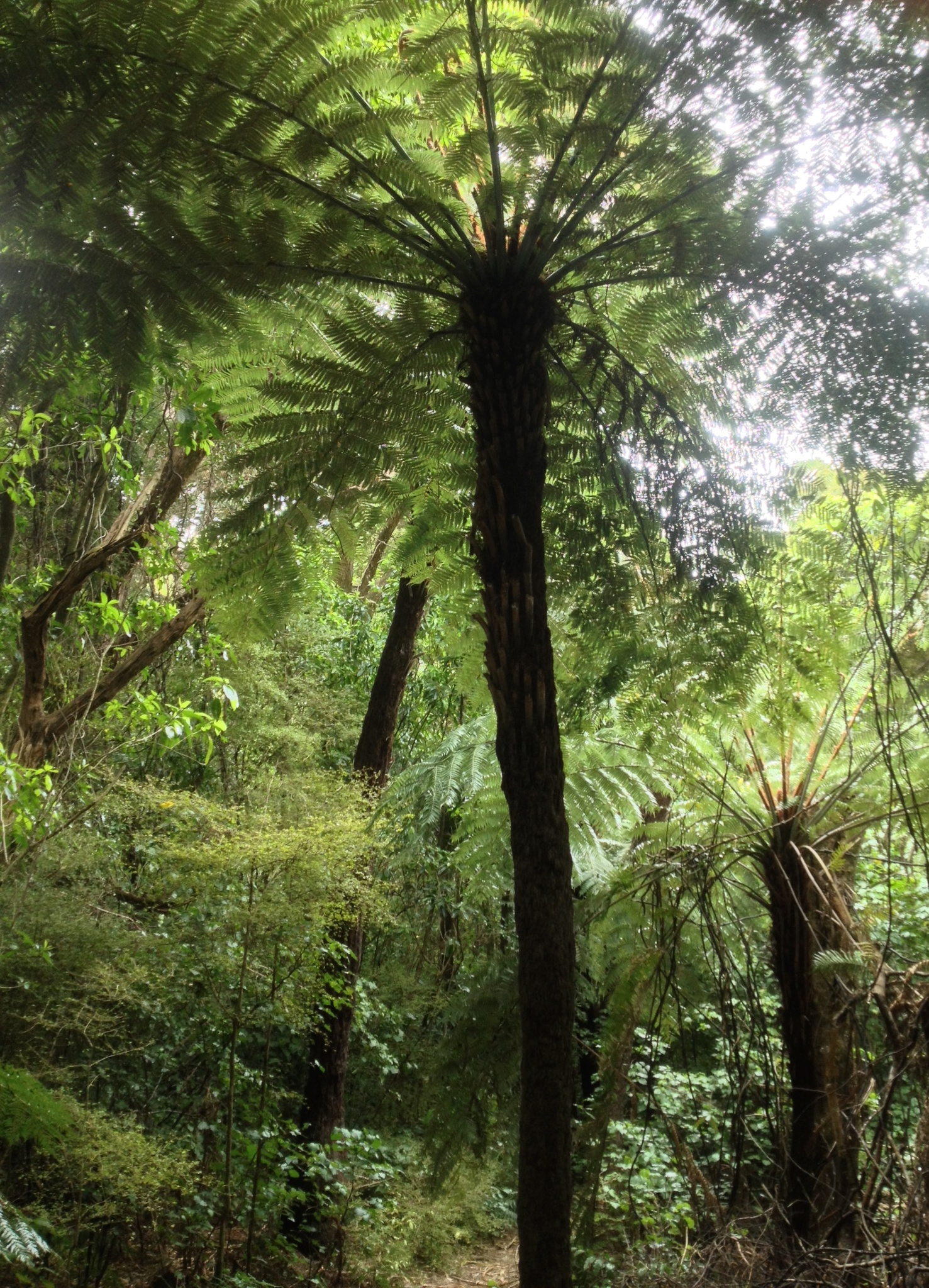
Silver fern in the subcanopy of a forest

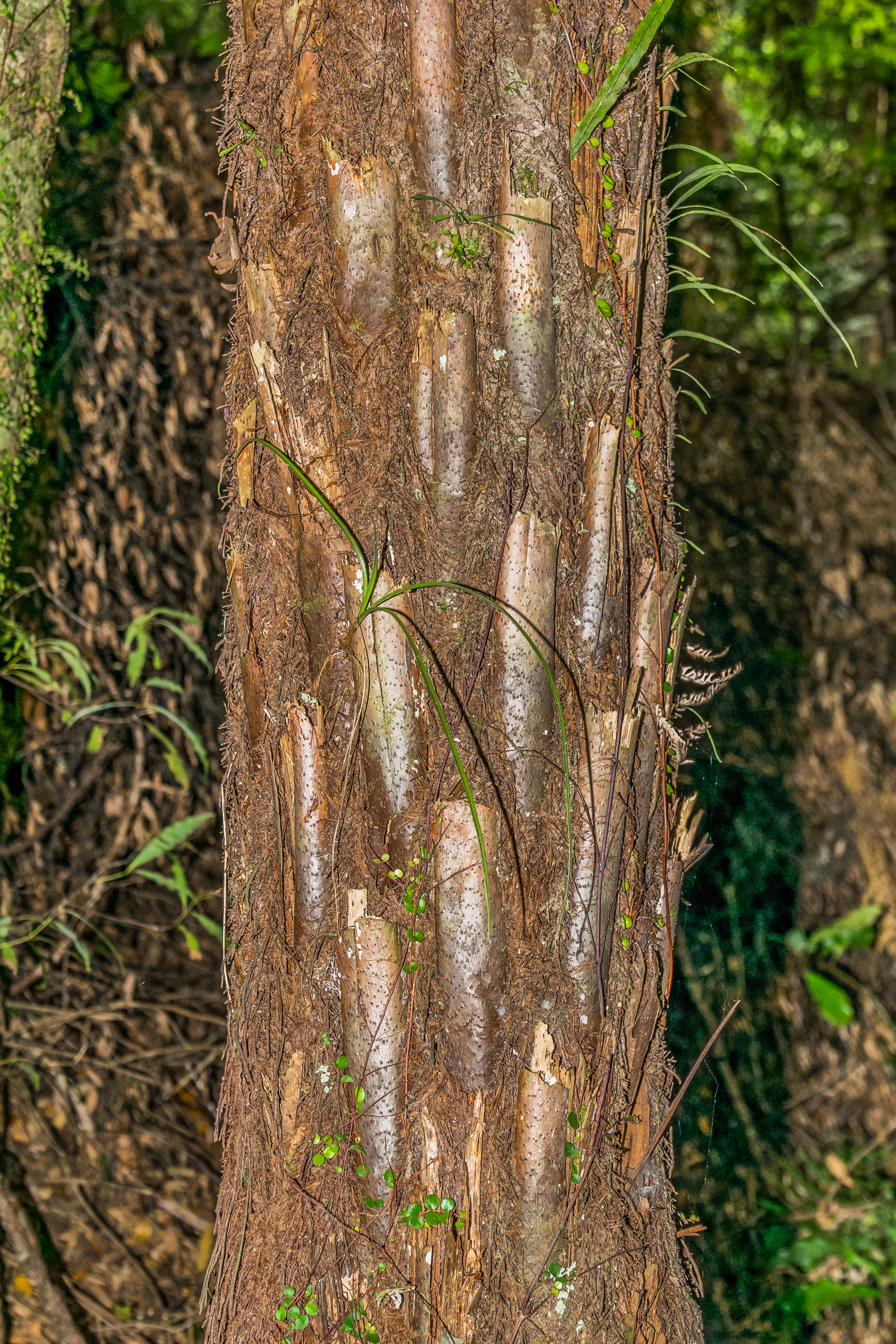
Trunk

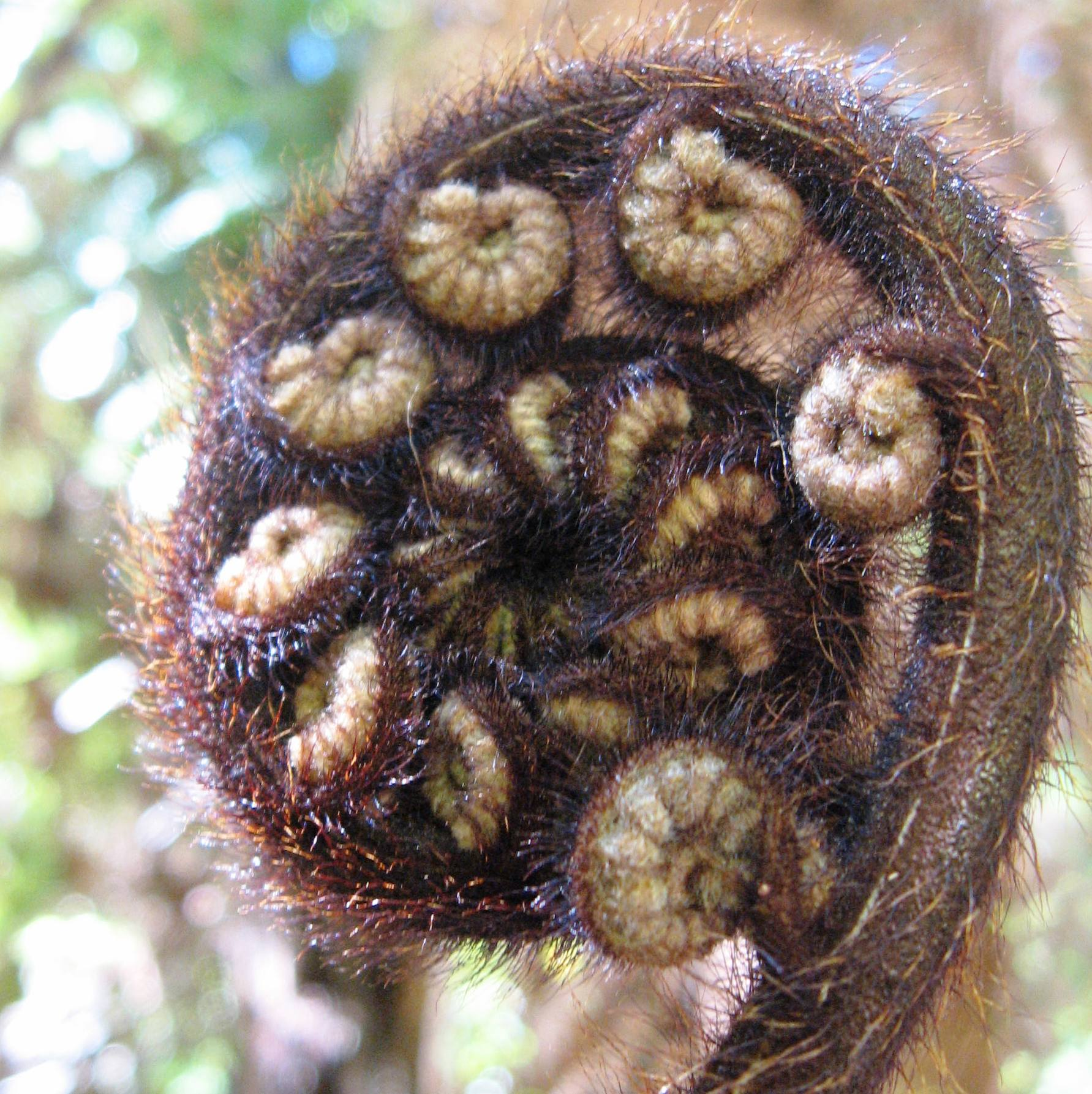
A koru, or silver fern fiddlehead

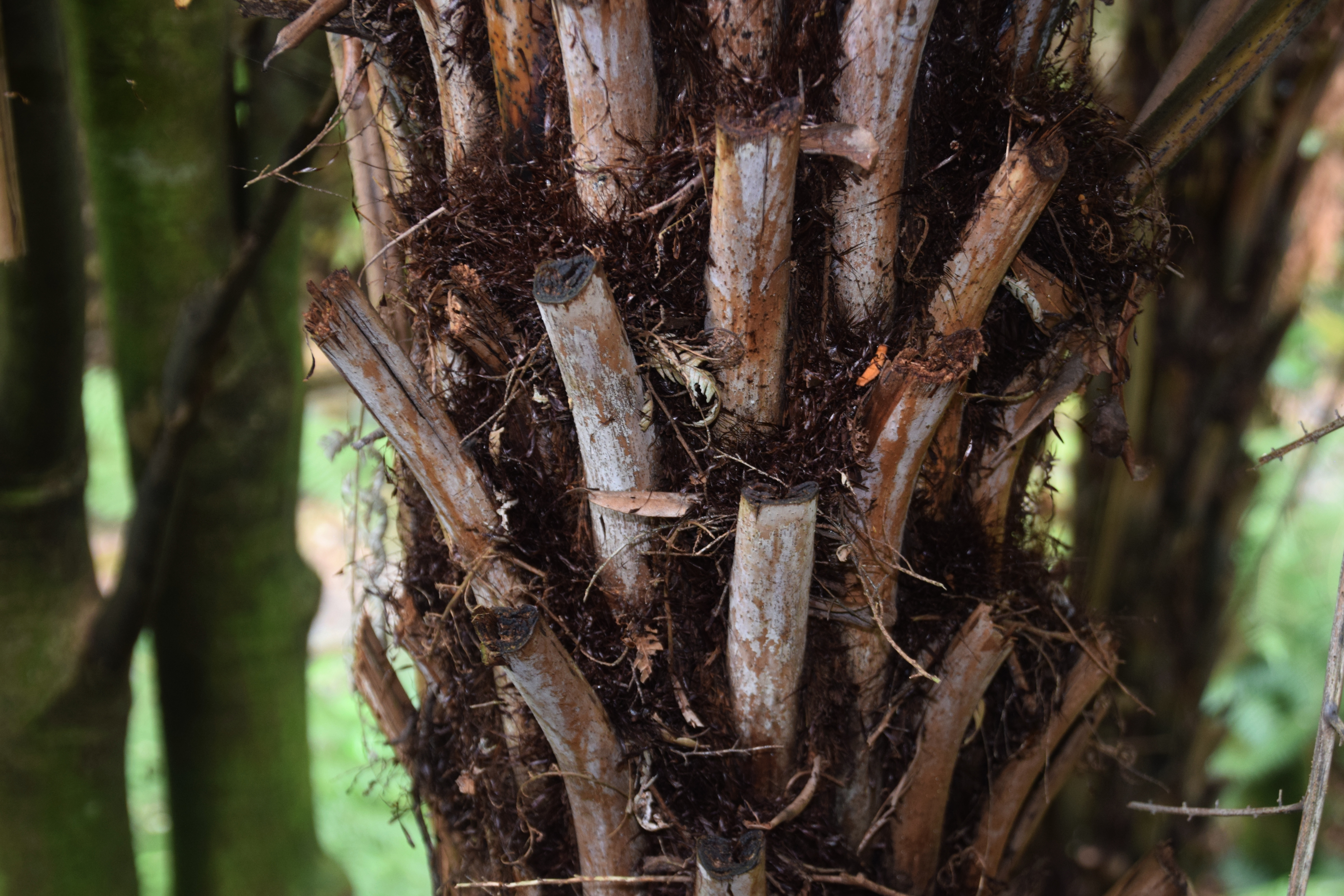
Higher section of a trunk, where older fronds have fallen

== Taxonomy ==
The species was first formally described in 1786 by German naturalist Georg Forster in the book Florulae Insularum Australium Prodromus, who used the name Polypodium dealbatum. The species was moved to the genus Cyathea by Olof Swartz in 1801, leading to the scientific name Cyathea dealbata. The species was moved to the genus Alsophila in 1970 by Rolla M. Tryon Jr., who used the name Alsophila tricolor, citing William Colenso's 1883 description of Cyathea tricolor, which Colenso believed was a species distinct from Cyathea dealbata.

The current preferred scientific name is disputed, with Plants of the World Online, New Zealand Plant Conservation Network, and the Synonymic Checklist and Distribution of Ferns and Lycophytes of the World Version 25.06 preferring Alsophila dealbata, Manaaki Whenua – Landcare Research preferring Cyathea dealbata and World Flora Online preferring Alsophila tricolor. The name Alsophila tricolor was considered the correct scientific name for the species, due to the species epithet dealbata being preoccupied in the genus by a species described in 1848 by Carl Borivoj Presl, now considered a synonym of Sphaeropteris glauca. In 2025 it was shown that the silver fern has priority to use this name over the species Presl described, due to a reference made by August Carl Joseph Corda to the species in 1838, making Presl's use an illegitimate later homonym.

== Etymology ==
The species epithet dealbata means whitish, and refers to the underside of the fronds. The Māori word ponga, pronounced [ˈpɔŋa], is a term used across Polynesian languages to describe tree ferns, such as Sphaeropteris lunulata in Tongan and Samoan or Angiopteris evecta in Samoan. It has been borrowed into New Zealand English using both the spelling ponga and punga, and is used as a generic term for tree ferns, and to refer to tree fern logs when used for landscaping purposes. English speakers generally pronounce the word /ˈpʌŋə/ PUNG-ə. Other Māori language names for the plant include kaponga, kātote, or poka in southern dialects.

== Habitat ==
Arriving relatively late in New Zealand's history during the Pliocene epoch (around 5.0–1.8 million years ago), the silver fern occurs on the main islands of New Zealand—although absent from the west and south regions of the South Island, on the Chatham Islands to the east, and is also native to Lord Howe Island. It has also become naturalised in Ireland. Its primary habitat is subcanopy areas of drier forests and in open scrub, although it is occasionally found on bush margins and in more open areas, and has been recorded from amongst rushes in a dune slack.

The fern is known to grow well in well-drained humus, and once established, it will tolerate drier conditions. It does best when sheltered from winds and should be protected from frost. Evidence of large amount of macro-charcoals in the top layers of soil suggest that Alsophila tricolor establishes itself in areas where anthropogenic fires occur.

== Traditional Māori culture ==
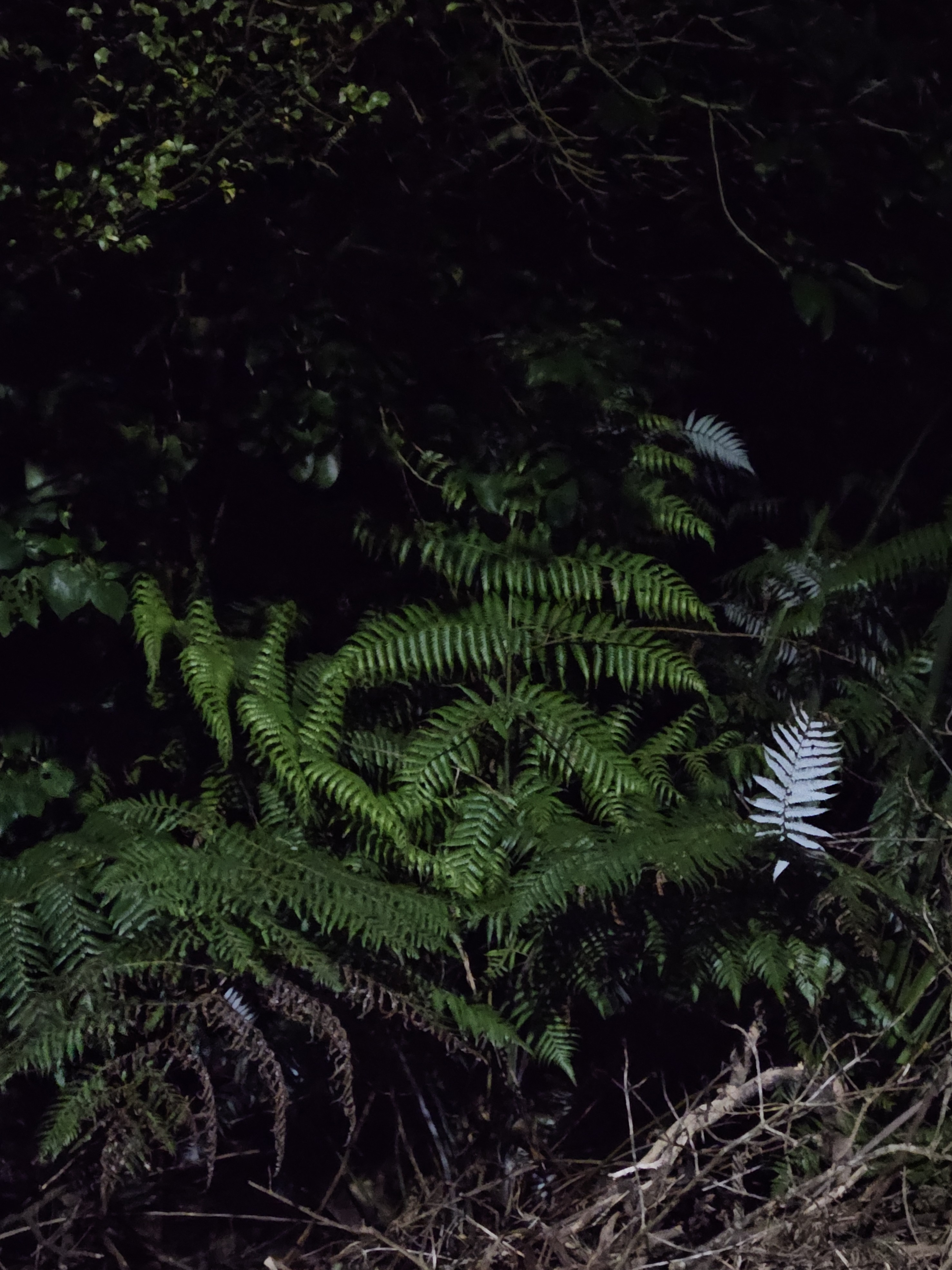
The reverse site of fern fronds were traditionally used at night time by Māori hunters as a wayfinding tool

In traditional Māori culture, ponga is seen as a symbol new life and growth. Ponga trunks were often used in the construction of whare, walls and palisades. The koru symbol, which depicts the shape of an unfurling silver fern frond, is found extensively in Māori art, including in designs of carvings, marae and tā moko, Pūrākau (traditional stories) involve the silver fern once living in the sea, and that hunters at night time would use the white underside of fern fronds to mark a path home in the darkness, as the undersides could easily catch moonlight.

== Modern uses ==
Ponga logs are widely used in landscaping in New Zealand, used to create retaining walls and edging for gardens.

== As a symbol of New Zealand ==
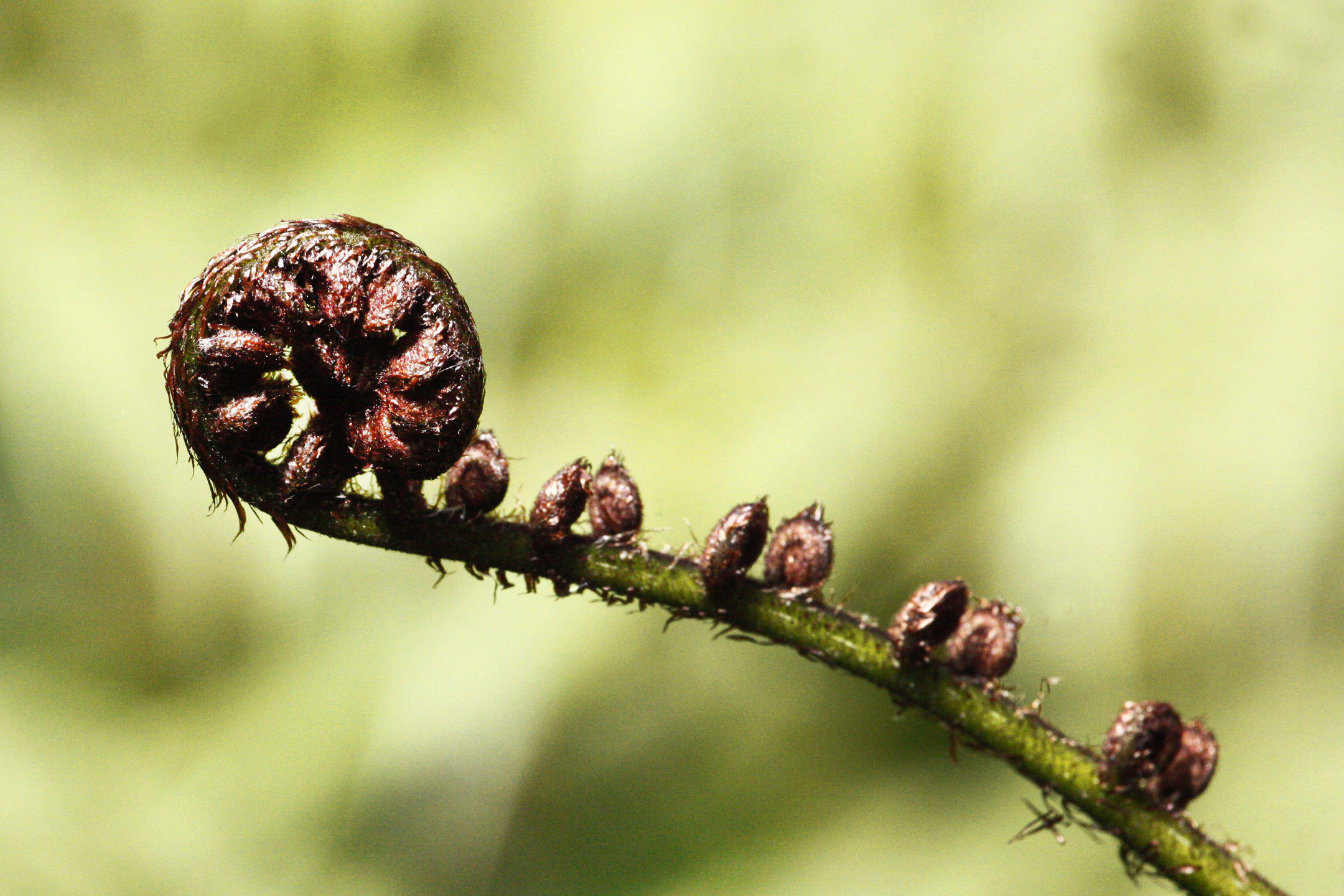
Koru or unfurling frond of silver fern

The silver fern is one of the most widely recognised symbols of New Zealand. The first use of the silver fern as a symbol representing New Zealand was during the 1888–89 New Zealand Native football team tour of Britain, after which the symbol came to be used on dairy products exported from New Zealand to the United Kingdom.

The silver fern was used as an identified by the New Zealand Army during the Second Boer War. Since then, the silver fern has been used by the New Zealand Expeditionary Force during both world wars, and all Commonwealth war graves of fallen New Zealand soldiers have the silver fern engraved on their tombstones. During the 1956 Suez Crisis, Egyptians took exception to New Zealand and Canadian peacekeepers having the Union Flag on their uniforms. Canadian troops wore the Maple Leaf whereas the New Zealand contingent wore a silver fern symbol. New Zealand peacekeepers have since used both the silver fern and kiwi symbols for different deployments to differentiate from their Australian and British counterparts. Additionally, several British Army units wear the silver fern, normally as a battle honour granted for serving with New Zealand troops. For example, the Queen’s Royal Hussars, the Royal Wiltshire Yeomanry and the Warwickshire Yeomanry, all of whom fought with 2nd New Zealand Division at the Second Battle of El Alamein.

The silver fern has long been used on dairy products, including the logo of New Zealand Natural, and was trademarked as early as 1885. It is a logo for many other organisations, such as (heavily stylised) the rail operator KiwiRail. The Silver Fern is also the name of a class of railcar.

Silver fern fronds appear on the coat of arms of New Zealand. Some alternative flags for New Zealand, such as the silver fern flag, utilise the fern. The official proposal of the 2015–2016 New Zealand flag referendums featured the silver fern. The silver fern is also used extensively within politics and printed material, such as the logo of the New Zealand Labour Party.

The koru is part of the design of the Māori flag, and is used in a stylised form as the logo for national airline Air New Zealand. Its circular shape conveys the idea of perpetual movement, and its inward coil suggests a return to the point of origin.

The rejected silver fern flag proposal of the 2015 flag referendum

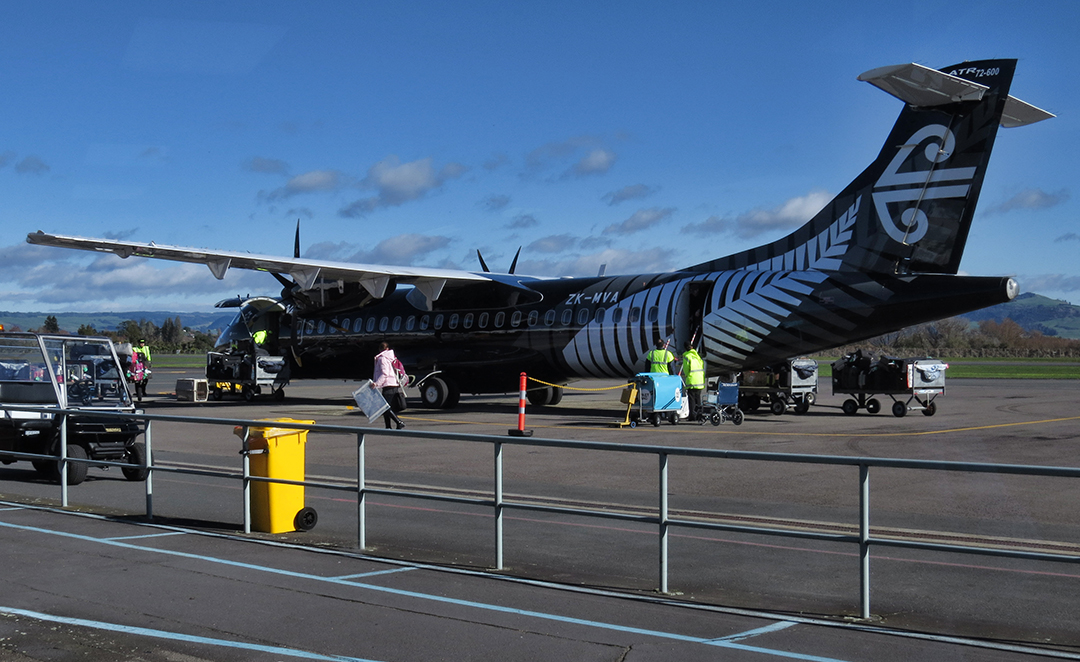
An Air New Zealand ATR 72-600 with a stylised koru on the tail and otherwise painted in all black livery with a silver fern on the fuselage

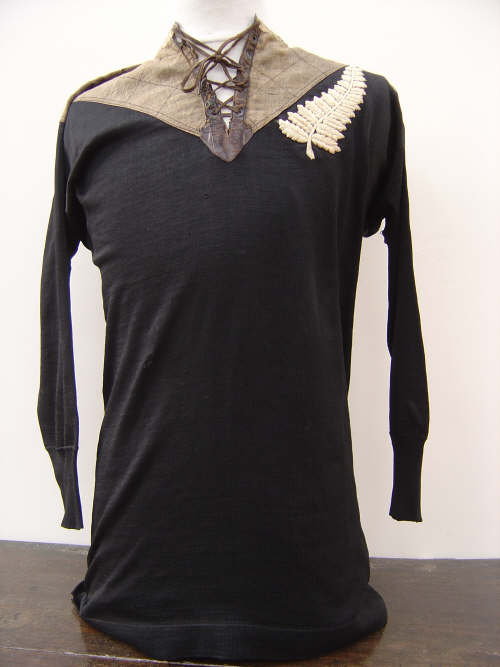
An All Blacks jersey from 1905, featuring a silver fern

=== Use in sport ===
The silver fern has been used as a symbol by New Zealand national sports teams, in various stylised forms, since it was first worn by players in the 1888–89 New Zealand Native football team which toured Britain. "Silver Ferns" is the name of the national netball team, and most other national women's sports teams have nicknames based on the term "Ferns", such as Black Ferns (women's rugby union), Tall Ferns (women's basketball) and Football Ferns (women's association football).

National sport teams using the silver fern include:

- All Blacks (rugby)
- Silver Ferns (netball)
- All Whites (football)
- Tall Blacks (basketball)
- White Ferns (women's cricket)
- Black Caps (men's cricket)
- Black Ferns (women's rugby)
- Black Sticks Men & Black Sticks Women (field hockey)
- Team New Zealand (sailing)
- Iron Blacks (American football)

The silver fern is also extensively used as part of the official symbols of New Zealand Olympics teams.

In 1991, the New Zealand Rugby Football Union obtained trade marks for the name "All Blacks" and its own stylised fern, however the scope of the application was broader because they sought to register any 'fern'. In 2005, after a legal case lasting four years, the union failed in its bid to stop anyone else using any fern logo on any black jersey.
