= William W. Lockwood =

William Wirt Lockwood (1906–1978) was an American academic who was Research Secretary (1935–1940) and Executive Secretary (1941–1943) at the Institute of Pacific Relations. In 1954, he published The Economic Development of Japan, which detailed the transformation of Japan from an agrarian society to one of the world's leading industrial powers.

He was president of the Association for Asian Studies in 1963.

He graduated from DePauw University and Harvard University.

== Selected publications ==
Lockwood, W. W. (1954). The economic development of Japan: Growth and structural change, 1868–1938. Princeton, N.J: Princeton University Press.

== Other sources ==
Princeton University:The William W. Lockwood Papers: William W. Lockwood 1919–1977 (The archive includes correspondence, minutes, conference reports, records of research projects, and publications documenting the American Institute of Pacific Relations (IPR)
