= James Lockwood =

James Lockwood may refer to:

- James Lockwood (British politician) (1888–1972), British politician
- James Lockwood (Connecticut politician) (1683–1769), member of the Connecticut House of Representatives from Norwalk in several nonconsecutive sessions between 1721 and 1751
- James Lockwood (rugby league) (born 1986), professional rugby league footballer
- James B. Lockwood (1852–1884), American soldier and explorer
- James Henry Lockwood (1793–1857), American businessman, fur trapper, lawyer, and public official
