= Charles Lockwood (criminal) =

American criminal

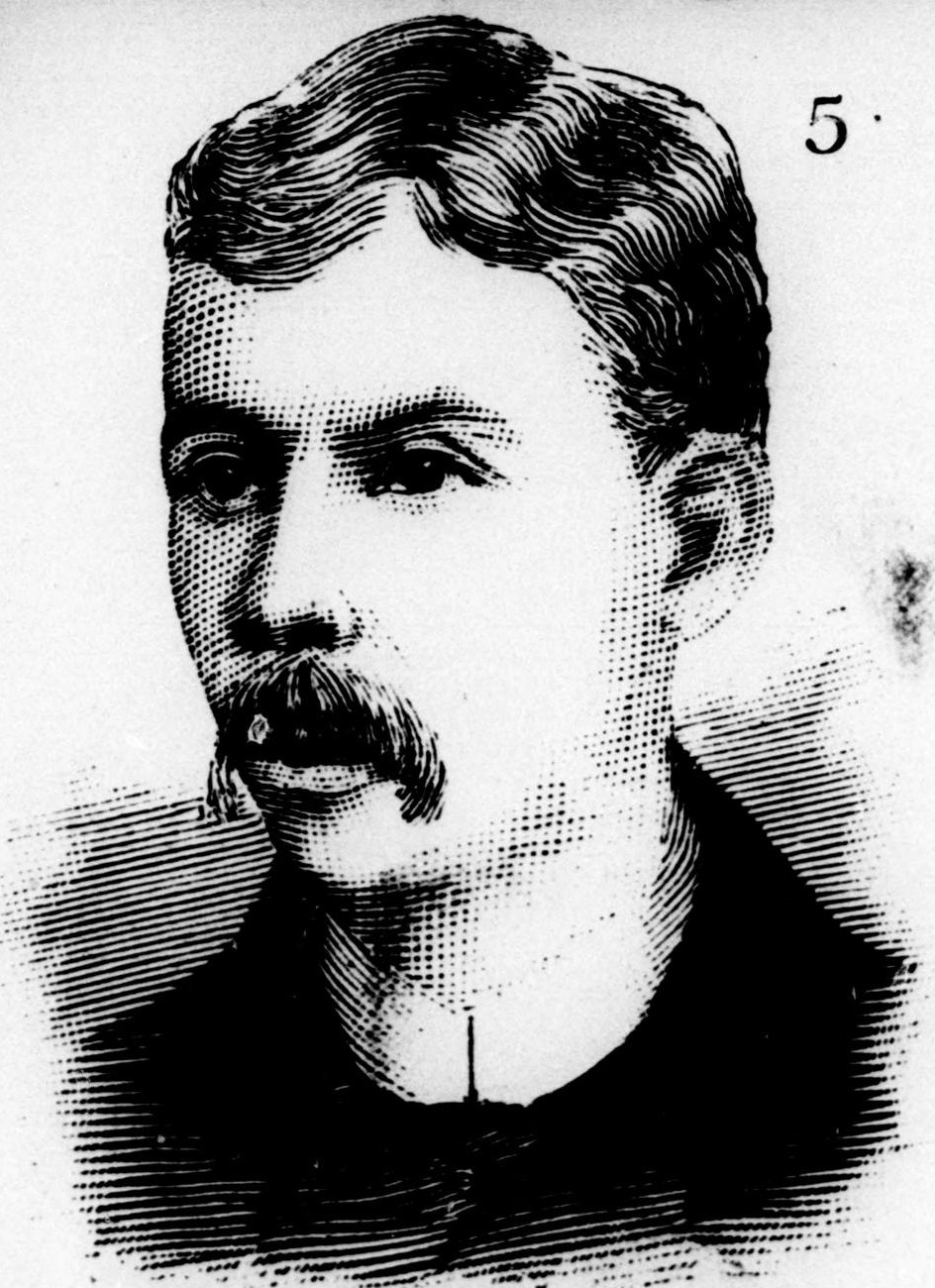
- Portrait of Charles Lockwood, murderer of Mattie Randall
- Born: Charles Lockwood; 1851; Sharon, Connecticut, U.S.
- Died: July 25, 1886 (aged 35); Northfield, Connecticut, U.S.

Charles Lockwood (c. 1851 – July 25, 1886), was an American criminal, known for his 1886 murder of Mattie Randall, and the conspiracies of his death following the event.

== Early life ==
Lockwood was born around 1851 in Sharon, Litchfield County, to William Lockwood, Esq., and his first wife Harriet Lockwood (née Birdsill). His mother died in 1860, when he was 8, and his father remarried soon afterwards to Eunice Wardwell.

== Murder of Mattie Randall ==
=== Background ===
In early 1886, the Randall family Calvert M., Emily Castle, Mattie, and Gertrude relocated from Brooklyn to Morris. Following the death of their infant daughter in 1879, the family's move was reportedly motivated by Mrs. Randall's declining health. The family integrated into the community through participation in local church activities. Contemporary reports in The Morning Journal-Courier praised the family's eldest daughter, Mattie, describing her as possessing 'ideal womanhood.'

The family purchased a farm in the eastern part of town from Almon Johnson, on April 1, 1886. The farm came with several barns, and an ideal old-fashioned New England homestead, surrounded by groupings of old trees and clumps of various flowers. It was a pleasant spot, and one the family was excited to call their own. Most of the money the family had been saving for years was put into this property, leaving them will little left for necessary improvements. However, each member of the family was ready to pull in their work. Mattie got a job teaching the spring term at the Mill School just north of their home, and assisted her mother with her work indoors, as well as helping her father with his work around the farm when needed.

On many farms at the time, it was common for the hired man to stay with the farm when purchased by someone else. Lockwood, who came well recommended by Johnson, went under the possession of the Randall family after their purchase.

=== The Morris tragedy ===
Early on the morning of Thursday, July 22, 1886, Mr. Randall set out to a neighbor's lot who he'd promised to mow, leaving his wife and two young daughters at home. Thursday was delivery day for the Randalls, who had a small farm produce route in Thomaston. The regular delivery was put off till evening that day, since Mr. Randall had his horses tied up in the mowing job. After which, he planned to return to an upper field to make hay. Around 10 a.m., two-three hours following Mr. Randall's departure, Lockwood approached the house, stating to Mrs. Randall that Mattie was wanted by her father to help ride the horse-rake in the hayfield. Lockwood then picked up his double-barrel shotgun, saying he would see if he could shoot a bird or two since he didn't feel like working, and started off to the field. Mattie, who had been sweeping the chambers in the upper level of the house, was called by her mother. Upon being informed on what Lockwood had said, a white pigeon landed on her shoulder, (they'd kept pigeons on the farm as pets,) causing Mattie to exclaim: "Mama, what does this mean? Are you or I going to be taken away;" having had other recent encounters with deathly symbols, Mattie felt some uneasiness, but her mother thought she'd better go. So Mattie grabbed her hat, and started north up the road alone.

Following his exit to the field, Lockwood (who supposedly must've planned this for some time) filled each barrel with a charge consisting of small stones, gravel, and fragments of lead. He then concealed himself among a thicket of bushes by the barway that obstructed entrance into the hayfield. Knowing she would have to pass through the bars first, he laid in wait for her to cross by.

Mattie followed the route to the upper hayfield, turning left a half a mile north of the house, and traversing through the barway, passing the bush where Lockwood was hiding, and crossing the pasture to which the field lay west 330 feet beyond. Once Mattie arrived at the hay lot, she realized that the hay had not been cut, and while preparing to turn back she was confronted by Lockwood. It is presumed that following Lockwood's appearance, and on her attempt to leave, a struggle ensued, during which she defended herself. He then made several proposals to her, which she dismissed, causing him to lose his temper. Seeing red, Lockwood raised his gun and pointed it at the girl, who was on her knees. The gun was then discharged, sending a heavy shot through her right breast, near the nipple, shattering three ribs and tearing a hole through the left of her spinal column. Mattie died instantly, collapsing to the ground as blood spurted out of the wound in her breast.

Lockwood, in distress, fired the second round at his left breast. However, the wound was not fatal enough to kill him. Throwing down his gun, he proceeded to drag the mutilated body of the girl to the corner of the field, resting it out of sight of the cart path, near the fence. In his haste he failed to notice his hat, that had fallen from his head.

Hurrying to remove himself from the scene, Lockwood returned to the farmhouse, and without saying anything to any of the family, made his way upstairs, quickly changing some of his clothes, then fled.

Around 12 p.m., Mr. Randall, who'd finished his work in the neighbor's field, mounted his horse for the ride home. He'd taken longer than expected, and decided to return home for a late dinner before cutting the hay in the upper lot. During this passage he unknowingly rode directly by the body of his daughter. When he arrived, he was greeted by his small 3-year-old daughter at the gate, who ran out shouting "Papa, papa; where is Mattie?!" He stated that he did not know, and was soon informed by his wife of Lockwood's request, and how he'd returned alone minutes later. At this, Randall started out in search of his missing daughter, bearing a terrible premonition of what he might find. Through the bars in the old stone wall around the wood lot, the short grass was beaten down, bearing evidence of a struggle. Almost immediately afterward, Mattie's body was discovered about 40 feet beyond in the corner of the stone wall, her light summer dress soaked in blood flowing from the wound.

=== Aftermath ===
His description was published in the front page of the New York Times:

"Wanted for the murder of Mattie Randall, of Morris, Conn., July 22, Charles Lockwood, farmhand, 35 years old, 5 feet 8 inches high; weight, 190 pounds; has heavy sandy mustache; wore, when last seen, a black coat and overalls, but has probably changed them since."

== Death ==
Around 11 a.m. on Sunday, July 25, 1886, Henry Cooke and Edgar Benedict started a search of their own on the east side of the section. While on their hunt, they came across a trail containing footprints and broken underbrush. Following this path they came upon Lockwood's dead body, hanging from a tree and still warm. This discovery was located approximately 330 feet east of George Johnston's homestead, and only half a mile east of where the girl was murdered. A gunshot wound was found in his breast (which was determined to be self-inflicted), as well as a slit on his throat. The cut had been made with a broken blade, which was the type of knife Lockwood owned. The coroner deemed his death a suicide, but it is widely believed he was lynched.
