= Julia Belden Lockwood =

American philanthropist

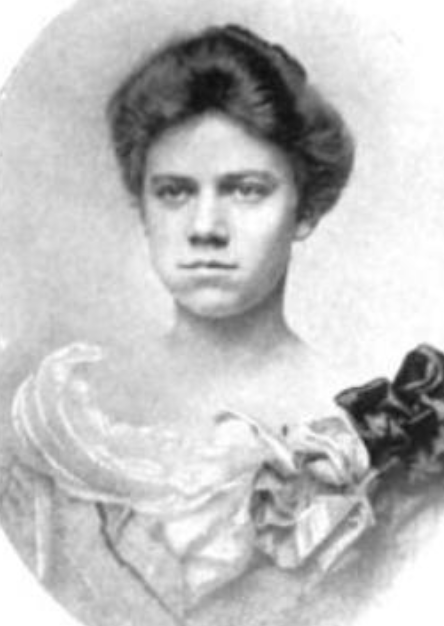
- Julia Belden Lockwood, from the 1901 yearbook of Vassar College
- Born: June 30, 1881; Norwalk, Connecticut
- Died: January 3, 1976 (age 94); Pasadena, California
- Occupation: Philanthropist
- Relatives: Eliphalet Lockwood (great-grandfather)

Julia Belden Lockwood (June 30, 1881 – January 3, 1976) was an American socialite and philanthropist. She was one of the Lockwood family members who donated family heirlooms to create the Norwalk Historical Society Museum.

== Early life and education ==
Lockwood was from Norwalk, Connecticut, the daughter of Frederick St. John Lockwood and Caroline Ayres Lockwood. Her father, a Yale graduate, was a bank and railroad executive. Her mother attended Troy Female Seminary from 1858 to 1860. Her great-grandfather, Eliphalet Lockwood, was a state legislator. She graduated from Vassar College in 1901.

Lockwood was president of the Vassar Athletic Association, and competed as a college athlete in track, basketball, and tennis. She was also an experienced horsewoman. She attended courses at Connecticut Agricultural College in 1912, and Massachusetts Agricultural College in 1914.

== Farming ==
Lockwood and her partner Mayone Lewis bought a Connecticut farm, Blithefield (or Blythfield), in 1915. They laid out orchards with over 1000 fruit trees, and had fields of corn, rye, buckwheat, turnips, oats, barley, and other crops. They sold tomatoes, potatoes, carrots, onions, peas, cabbage, melons, cucumbers and lima beans during World War I. "If one has a love for animals and for outdoor life generally," she wrote in 1918, "she can certainly find contentment and happiness on the farm."

== California and philanthropy ==
Lockwood and Lewis toured the Canadian Rockies on horseback, and moved to Pasadena, California together in the 1925. They were both active in women's golf tournaments in the 1920s. Lockwood was also active in the Pasadena College Woman's Club, and supported the Huntington Library, Descanso Gardens, Pasadena Boys' Club, the YWCA and YMCA, the Sierra Club, and other organizations with her donations. She traveled, and kept journals of her travels.

In 1969, Lockwood and her second cousin Manice deForest Lockwood donated money to create the Norwalk Historical Society Museum, and donated many of the family's possessions to the museum.

== Publications ==
- "The Making of Blithefield Farm” (1918)

== Legacy ==
Lockwood died in 1976, at the age of 94, in Pasadena. The Julia Belden Lockwood Manuscript Collection at Norwalk Public Library contains her correspondence, photographs, journals, and clippings. The Norwalk Historical Society marked Women's History Month in 2016 with a lecture about Lockwood's life.
