= Elise Lockwood =

American scholar of mathematics education

Elise Nicole Lockwood is an American scholar of mathematics education and a professor of mathematics at Oregon State University. Her research focuses on combinatorial and algorithmic thought processes in undergraduate mathematics students.

== Education and career ==
Lockwood was an undergraduate at Wheaton College, an Evangelical Christian school in Illinois. She graduated magna cum laude with a bachelor's degree in mathematics in 2004, and continued her studies in mathematics education at Portland State University, initially intending to become a high school mathematics teacher. At Portland State, she earned a master's degree in 2006 and completed a Ph.D. in 2011. Her doctoral dissertation, Student Approaches to Combinatorial Enumeration: The Role of Set-Oriented Thinking, was supervised by Sean Larsen.

From 2011 to 2013 she was a postdoctoral research fellow at the University of Wisconsin–Madison. She joined Oregon State University as an assistant professor in 2013, and was promoted to associate professor in 2018 and full professor in 2023. From 2021 to 2024 she took a leave from Oregon State to work as a program officer at the National Science Foundation. In 2019 she became a Fulbright Scholar, funding her travel to the University of Oslo in Norway and again in 2025 to Maynooth University in Ireland.

== Recognition ==
Lockwood was the 2018 recipient of the Annie and John Selden Prize for Research in Undergraduate Mathematics Education of the Mathematical Association of America. She was a 2025 recipient of the Presidential Early Career Award for Scientists and Engineers.
