= Lockwood v. American Airlines, Inc. =

- Court: United States Court of Appeals for the Federal Circuit
- Full case name: Lawrence B. Lockwood v. American Airlines, Inc.
- Decided: March 4, 1997
- Citations: 107 F.3d 1565; 65 USLW 2632; 41 U.S.P.Q.2d 1961

Court membership
- Judges sitting: Haldane Robert Mayer, Alan David Lourie, Randall R. Rader

Case opinions
- Majority: Lourie, joined by a unanimous panel

Laws applied
- 35 U.S.C. §§ 102–103

Lockwood v. American Airlines, Inc., 107 F.3d 1565 (Fed. Cir. 1997), was a case for the United States Court of Appeals for the Federal Circuit in which Lawrence B. Lockwood sued American Airlines, Inc for patent infringement for their reservation system, SABREvision. The case was first heard by the United States District Court for the Southern District of California, which ruled in favor of American Airlines, Inc. In the summary judgment for that case, the court ruled that American Airlines, Inc's SABREvision system did not infringe on U.S. Patent Re. 32,115, U.S. Patent 4,567,359, and U.S. Patent 5,309,355 held by Lockwood. Furthermore, the court ruled that the '355 patent was invalid under 35 U.S.C. § 102 and the asserted claims of the '359 patent were invalid under 35 U.S.C. § 103. The Court of Appeals for the Federal Circuit upheld these rulings in favor of American Airlines, Inc. based on the fact that district court determined there were no genuine issues of material fact in dispute.

== Participants ==
=== Plaintiff ===
The plaintiff in this case was Lawrence B. Lockwood, who held the '115, '359 and '355 patents. He also holds seven other patents, with a total of ten patents in his name. Most of the patents he holds are related to "systems" of a "self-service" nature used for "sales presentations".

Robert M. Taylor, Jr. of the law firm Lyon & Lyon LLP in Costa Mesa, California argued for Lockwood.

=== Defendant ===
The defendant in this case was American Airlines, Inc. an American-based airline company. It is one of the major airlines companies in the United States and second-largest airline company in the world.

Don W. Martens of the firm Knobbe, Martens, Olsen & Bear LLP in Newport Beach, CA argued for American Airlines. Joseph R. Re and Paul A. Stewart were also on the case. Martens was one of the founding members of his firm and was later a mediator for the United States Court of Appeals for the Federal Circuit.

=== Court ===
This case was presented for the United States District Court for the Southern District of California presided by Judge William B. Enright. Judge Enright started as a deputy district attorney in San Diego, CA in 1951 and was appointed to the United States District Court for the Southern District of California in 1972.

This case was then argued before the United States Court of Appeals for the Federal Circuit before circuit Judges Haldane Robert Mayer, Alan David Lourie and Randall R. Rader. Mayer was appointed to the court in 1997 and was Chief Judge from 1997 to 2004. Lourie was appointed to the court in 1990. Rader was appointed to the court in 1990 and became Chief Judge in 2010.

== Background ==
Lockwood sued American claiming that their SABREvision reservation system infringed on the three patents he held, '115, '359, and '355.

=== SABREvision ===
SABREvision is the reservation system created by American. It is an improved version of SABRE, the original system that American developed in the 1960s. SABREvision is used by travel agents

- to access schedules
- fare information
- to book itineraries
- to retrieve photographs of places of interest, including
  - hotels
  - restaurants
  - cruises

for their customers.

=== U.S. Patent Re. 32,115 ===
This patent is for "a self service terminal for dispensing voice and video information, printed documents, and goods; and for accepting service orders and payments therefor by currency or credit card".

The district court ruled that SABREvision did not infringe this patent because it was not in violation of the following four parts of the asserted Claim 11:

- "a substantially self-contained apparatus dimensioned to be easily transported"
- "audio-visual means"
- "customer operated means"
- "means for collecting payments"

=== U.S. Patent 4,567,359 ===
This patent is for "a system for automatically dispensing information, goods and services to a customer on a self-service basis including a central data processing center in which information on services offered by various institutions in a particular industry is stored".

The district court ruled that SABREvision did not infringe this patent because it did not have "audio-visual means" or "customer-operated input means" as was asserted by Claim 1.

In addition, the district court ruled that patent '359 was invalid because its claims were obvious in combination of the original SABRE system and the patent reissued as '115.

=== U.S. Patent 5,309,355 ===
This patent is for "An apparatus for composing individualized sales presentations created by various data sources from customer profiles managed by organizational hierarchy matrixes directed by multiple operating programs".

The district court ruled that SABREvision did not infringe this patent because it did not "compose 'individualized sales presentations' or 'selectively combine' customer information to retrieve its photographs" as was asserted by Claim 1.

Additionally, the district court found the '355 patent invalid because it could be anticipated by the '359 patent under 35 U.S.C. § 102(b).

== Patent validity ==
=== Patent '359 ===
The district court ruled that the patent '359 was invalid because its claims were obvious due to the prior art in patent '631 and American's original SABRE reservation system.

Lockwood argues that SABRE is not prior art because certain algorithms of the system were not available to the public and therefore an expert would not be able to reproduce the system. In addition, he claims that even if SABRE was considered prior art, combining it with patent '631 was not enough to claim patent '359 was obvious.

American responds that SABRE was unveiled in 1962 and was used by many different airlines by 1970. While there are "inner workings" that were kept hidden, the functionality of the system was known.

The appellate court decides that, as American stated, despite the fact that certain implementation details of SABRE were "inner workings", the public knew and used these features, and so it constitutes prior art. Additionally, the court does not agree with Lockwood's argument that the actual terminals described in both patents are different and therefore that the SABRE system combined with patent '631 was enough to claim that patent '359 was obvious.

=== Patent '355 ===
The district court ruled that patent '355 was invalid because its claims were anticipated by the '359 patent. The '359 patent was issued from the first of five applications. In addition, the '359 patent described the invention in patent '355. In order for the '355 patent to be valid, it must have an early enough filing date. The issue was whether the third, fourth and fifth applications were entitled to the filing date of the second application, which was undisputedly entitled to the benefit of the filing date of the first application. The district court ruled that not all of the third, fourth and fifth applications described the invention with accurate detail and therefore, patent '355 was not entitled to the earlier filing date.

Lockwood argued that the court only looked at the applications for the patents themselves, but failed to recognize that it was enough to show that he was "in possession" of the invention.

The appellate court disagreed with Lockwood's argument and held that the conditions for being entitled to an earlier filing date can only be satisfied by what is described in the applications themselves, not to any ideas implied by them. The court ruled that the patent '355 was invalid.

== Patent infringement ==
The district court ruled that American Airlines did not infringe on any of the three patents that Lockwood held. Lockwood argues to the appellate court that the district court "misconstrued" the claims of each of the patents.

=== Patent '115 ===
Lockwood claimed that "self-contained" means "apparatus or collection of components which includes the materials necessary for the apparatus to function on its own". American claimed that this argument contradicts the argument Lockwood presented to the U.S. Patent and Trademark Office when the patent was prosecuted. The appellate court agreed with American that Lockwood cannot claim one definition during that presentation and another one during this case.

Lockwood also argued that "audio-visual" means either audio or video (not necessarily both), and SABREvision violated that. The district court ruled and the appellate court agreed that both are necessary, and SABREvision cannot produce audio presentations.

In addition, Lockwood argued that "customer" should be interpreted as "someone with whom you do business" (including travel agents who use SABREvision). American claimed that the patents expressly state that the point of the invention is to eliminate travel agents; therefore, the "customer" of both structures is different. The appellate court agreed with American's claim.

=== Patent '359 ===
For this patent, Lockwood made similar arguments regarding "customer" and "audio-visual" as with the '115 patent. The appellate court made the same rulings that it did with patent '115.

=== Patent '355 ===
Lockwood disputed the district court's ruling that SABREvision's requirement of "manually selec[ting] and view[ing]" is not equivalent to "composing and displaying individualized sales presentations". The appellate court agreed with the district court, ruling that the two structures are different in that respect.

== Conclusion ==
The United States Court of Appeals for the Federal Circuit upheld the ruling made by the United States District Court for the Southern District of California. The court ruled that the '359 patent was invalid because it was obvious, and the '355 patent was invalid because its claims were anticipated by the '359 patent. The '115, '359, and '355 patents were not infringed by the SABREvision reservation system.
