= Michael Lockwood (public servant) =

British civil servant and policing watchdog

Michael Frederick Lockwood (born 6 February 1959) is a British former civil servant who has served in local government and as inaugural director general of the Independent Office for Police Conduct (IOPC), the policing watchdog for England and Wales.

== Career ==
In the 1980s, Lockwood worked as an auditor for Humberside County Council. Lockwood was the CEO of Harrow London Borough Council from 2007 until the end of 2013, when the position was eliminated, and again from 2015 after it was reinstituted. In the interim, he was executive director of finance and policy at the Local Government Association. After the 2017 Grenfell Tower fire, he led recovery work and liaised with survivors and victims' families. The Grenfell Tower Memorial Commission chose him as co-chair in early 2020.

He was appointed by the Home Office to head the IOPC from its inception in January 2018. As Director General, Lockwood also chaired the IOPC Board, the majority of which is made up of Non-Executive Directors. The Board advises the Director General and with him sets the strategy for the organisation. In October 2019 Lockwood published an op-ed in The Guardian, defending an investigation his organization had performed into the case of an alleged VIP paedophile ring.

He resigned as Director General on 3 December 2022 after he became the subject of a police investigation. He was charged with sexual offences against two girls, alleged to have occurred in Humberside in the 1980s; on 23 July 2024, he was found not guilty on all charges.
