= Periscleral lymph space =

Eye anatomy

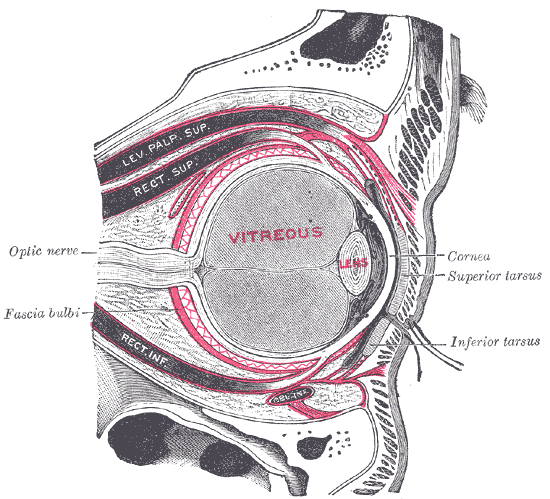
- The right eye in sagittal section, showing the periscleral lymph space, crossed by thin fibers of connective tissue (in pink) connecting the capsule of Tenon (in pink) with the sclera (in white).

Details

Identifiers
- Latin: spatium episclerale

The periscleral lymph space or episcleral space of the eye is the space between the outer surface of the sclera and the inner surface of the capsule of Tenon. It is continuous with the subdural and subarachnoid spaces, and is traversed by fine bands of connective tissue.
