= Charles Barrett Lockwood =

British surgeon and anatomist

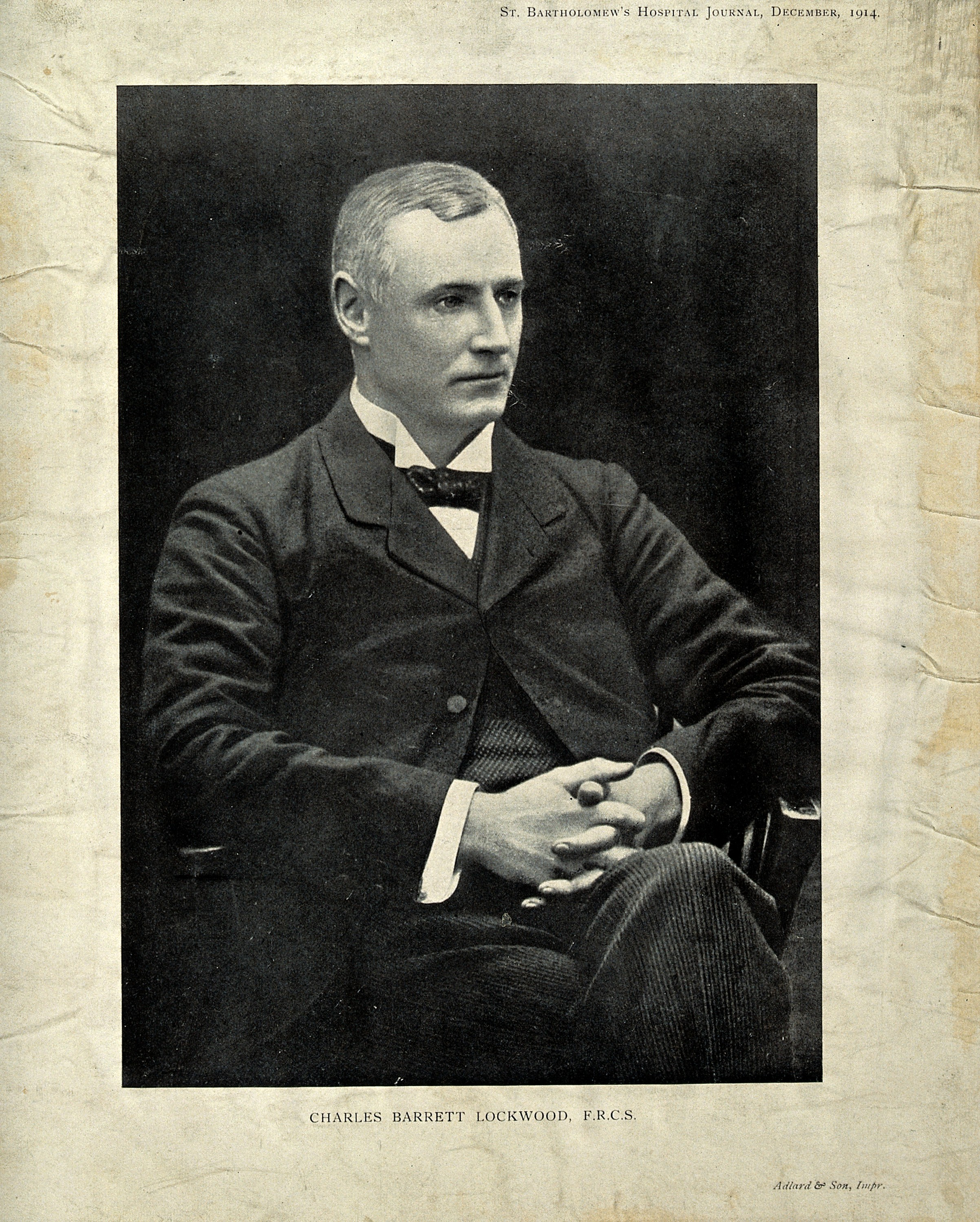
Charles Barrett Lockwood

Charles Barrett Lockwood (23 September 1856 – 8 November 1914) was a British surgeon and anatomist who practiced surgery at St. Bartholomew's Hospital in London. Lockwood was a member of the Royal College of Surgeons.

Lockwood is remembered for his surgical work with femoral and inguinal hernias. He developed an infra-inguinal approach for femoral hernia operations that is known today as the "low approach" or "Lockwood's operation". In 1893, he published an important book titled "Radical Cure of Femoral and Inguinal Hernia".

He first conceived the idea of an Anatomical Society in 1887, acted as their first treasurer and was elected president of the society for 1901 to 1903.

The "Lockwood's suspensory ligament" of the eye is named after him. This structure is the thickened area of contact between Tenon's capsule and the sheaths of the inferior rectus and inferior oblique muscles. This ligament is responsible for maintaining the position of the eyeball in its normal upward and forward position within the orbit.

== Selected writings ==
- "Hunterian Lectures on the Morbid Anatomy, Pathology, and Treatment of Hernia", (1889)
- "Radical Cure of Femoral and Inguinal Hernia", (1893)
- "Aseptic Surgery", (1896)
- Writings about Charles Lockwood:
- "The life and works of Charles Barrett Lockwood (1856–1914)". By Eric C. O. Jewesbury, M.A., (1934)
