= Thomas Lockwood (priest) =

Thomas Lockwood, Archdeacon of Kells, was appointed Dean of Christ Church, Dublin in December 1543 holding the post under four monarchs until his death in April 1565.
