= List of New Zealand flags =

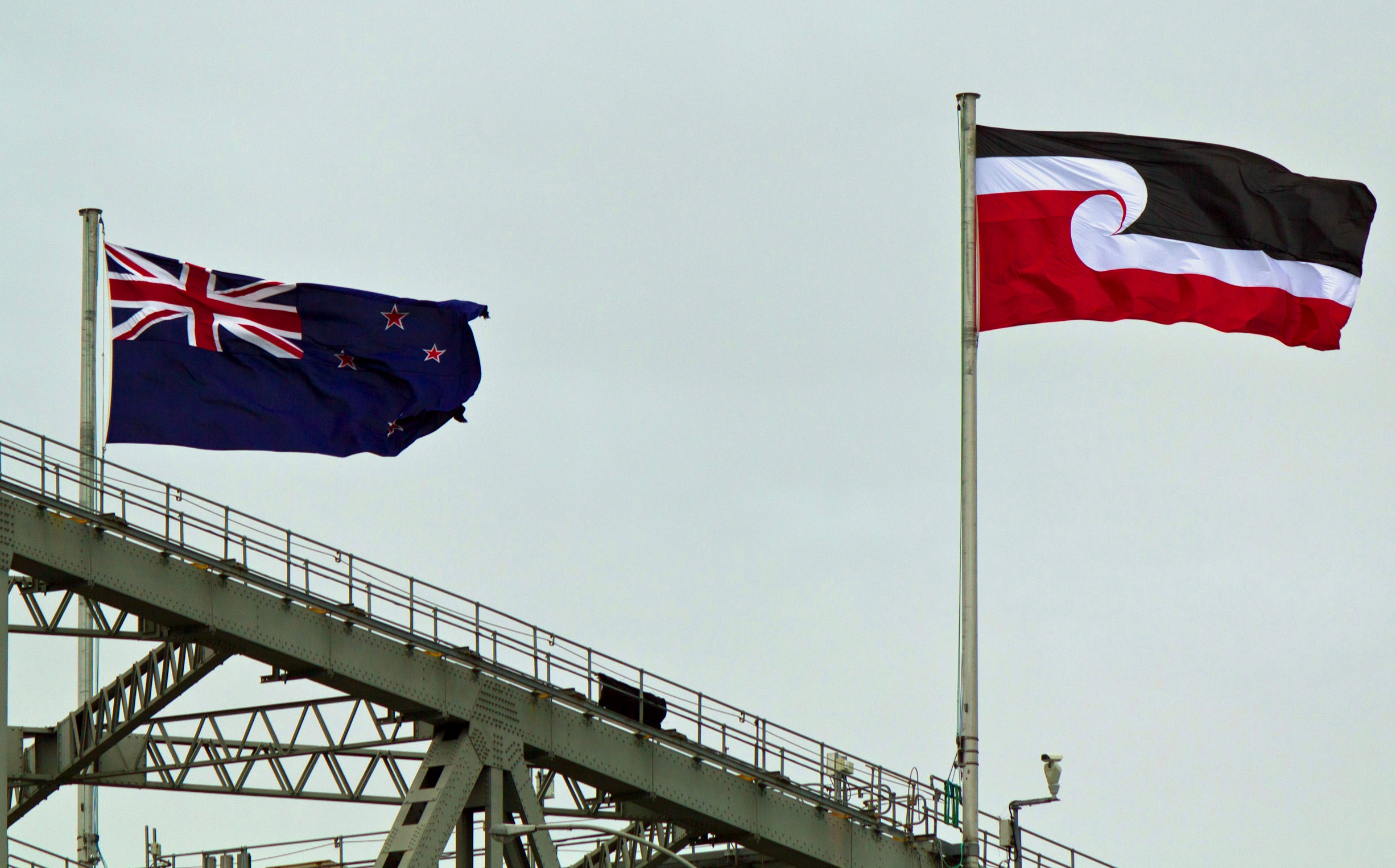
The national flag of New Zealand and Tino Rangatiratanga flag flying on Auckland Harbour Bridge, on Waitangi Day, 2012

This is a list of flags of New Zealand. It includes flags that either have been in use or are currently used by institutions, local authorities, or the government of New Zealand. Some flags have historical or cultural (e.g. Māori culture) significance.

== National flags ==
Flag	Date	Use	Description
	1834–1840 (Note: In use sporadically as a national flag until the adoption of the current flag in 1902.)	Flag of the United Tribes of New Zealand	Based on the White Ensign. A Saint George's Cross with the canton consisting of a blue field, another St. George's cross with white fimbriation, and a white eight-pointed star in each of the quarters. (See also variant design under "Māori flags" below)
	1840–1867 (Note: The Union Jack was described as the "superior flag", to be flown above the New Zealand flag prior to 1965.)	British Union Flag	Adopted following the signing of the Treaty of Waitangi in 1840.
	1867–1869	The first flag of New Zealand based on the Blue Ensign	Blue Ensign with the red letters "NZ" outlined in white.
	1902–present (Note: Officially adopted the national flag, in use from 1869 on colonial gunboats.)	Flag of New Zealand	A defaced Blue Ensign with four red stars with white borders in the fly, representing the constellation of Crux, the Southern Cross.

== Royal and viceregal ==
Flag	Date	Use	Description
	1962–2022	Personal Flag of Queen Elizabeth II in New Zealand	A banner of the coat of arms of New Zealand, defaced with a blue disc bearing the crowned letter 'E' in gold.
	1869–1874	Flag of the governor of New Zealand	A Union Flag defaced with four five-pointed stars. This design was due to a misinterpretation of design instructions.
	1874–1908	Flag of the governor of New Zealand	A Union Flag defaced with a white circle, with four red stars and the initial 'NZ' at the centre, surrounded by a green wreath.
	1908–1936	Flag of the governor of New Zealand	A Union Flag defaced with a white circle, with four red stars and the initial 'NZ' at the centre, surrounded by a wreath of ferns.
	1936–1947	Flag of the governor-general of New Zealand	A lion standing atop a crown, over a scroll inscribed "Dominion of New Zealand".
	1947–1953	Flag of the governor-general of New Zealand	A lion standing atop a crown, over a scroll inscribed "New Zealand".
	1953–2008	Flag of the governor-general of New Zealand	A lion standing atop a crown, over a scroll inscribed "New Zealand".
	2008–present	Flag of the governor-general of New Zealand	The shield of the New Zealand coat of arms surmounted by the Royal Crown.
	1979–present	Flag of the King's Representative in the Cook Islands	Flag of the Cook Islands with a crown in the centre of the ring of stars.

== Ensigns ==
Flag	Date	Use	Description
	1901–present	New Zealand Red Ensign	A Red Ensign with four white stars representing the Southern Cross.
	1941–1968	Royal New Zealand Navy Ensign	British White Ensign, previously used by the New Zealand Division of the Royal Navy (1921–1941). It was replaced by the New Zealand White Ensign.
	1968–present	Royal New Zealand Navy Ensign	A White Ensign with four red stars representing the Southern Cross.
	1939–present	Ensign of the Royal New Zealand Air Force	A light blue field with the roundel of the Royal Air Force defaced with the letters, "NZ".
	16 November 1938 – present	New Zealand Civil Air Ensign	A blue cross with a wide border on a light blue field. The Union Flag is in the canton, with the Southern Cross in the lower fly.
		New Zealand Police Ensign	A blue flag with the New Zealand Flag in the canton, and the NZP emblem in the fly.
		New Zealand Fire Service (Fire and Emergency Service) Ensign	A blue flag with the New Zealand Flag in the canton, and the Fire Service emblem in the fly.
	1966–present	New Zealand Customs Service Flag	A New Zealand Blue Ensign, with the letters "HMC" (for "Her Majesty's Customs" in the lower hoist was in use from 1966 to 1996. From 1996, the flag has had "NZ CUSTOMS SERVICE" in the lower hoist.
	1968–1998	New Zealand Ministry of Transport Ensign	A sky blue flag with the New Zealand Ensign in the canton, with the NZMOT coat of arms (not seen here) within a blue disc in the fly.
		Ensign of the Royal New Zealand Yacht Squadron	A white cross on a blue field, with the New Zealand flag in the canton.

== Associated states and territories ==
Flag	Date	Use	Description
	1979–present	Flag of the Cook Islands	A Blue Ensign defaced with fifteen stars in a ring.
	1975–present	Flag of Niue	A yellow ensign, the Union Flag has a blue disc with a yellow star in the middle and four yellow stars forming a diamond around it.
	2008–present	Flag of Tokelau	A blue flag with a stylized Polynesian canoe (vaka) in gold and a representation of the Southern Cross in the fly.
	1995–present	Proposed flag of the Ross Dependency	Flag of New Zealand with an azure blue field, and a white stripe at bottom.

== Regions and cities ==
Flag	Date	Use	Description
	1980–2010	Flag of Auckland City	A banner of arms of Auckland City's coat of arms. Blue canton with cornucopia in top-hoist. Red canton with pick and shovel in top-fly. White lower half with ship and blue horizontal.
	1993–present	Unofficial flag of the Chatham Islands	A blue flag with a depiction of the island superimposed on a rising sun.
	1976–present	Flag of Christchurch	A banner of arms of the coat of arms of Christchurch. Chevron Gules a Mitre between a Fleece and a Garbe of the first in base two Bars wavy Azure on a Chief of the last four Lymphads sails furled, also of the first And for the Crest on a Wreath Or and Azure a Kiwi proper.
	1979–present	Flag of Dunedin	A banner of arms of Dunedin's coat of arms. Argent a fess dancetty vert on which a sheep's head caboshed between two wheat sheafs all proper. In chief a three-towered castle sable, mortared of the first and flagged gules on a rock proper. In base a lymphad sable sailed and flagged azure.
	?–present	Flag of Invercargill	Invercargill has two flags: one with the city's coat of arms on a white square on a maroon field, the other with the council's logo on a white field.
	2020–present	Flag of Napier	Napier has two flags: one has the city's coat of arms on a blue field, and the other is a banner of arms of Napier's coat of arms. Three red roses from the coat of arms of Lord Napier and Ettrick (a direct descendant of Sir Charles Napier after whom Napier was named). Blue wave bands symbolise status as a coastal city and the Golden Fleece is the heraldic symbol of the wool industry, which Napier was one of the largest wool centres in New Zealand.
	1987–present	Flag of Nelson	A banner of arms of Nelson's coat of arms. Blue top third with bishop's mitre. Blue and white waves beneath with black cross flory.
	2004–present	Flag of Otago	Blue and gold, horizontally divided by a zigzag line ("dancetty", in vexillological terms), with counterchanged eight-pointed stars. Used by the Otago Regional Council, and widely by the general public in the Otago region.
	c. 1990–present	Flag of Palmerston North	Plain white background with central coat of arms. 'City of Palmerston North New Zealand' in black text above and below the coat of arms.
	1998–present	Flag of Porirua	The flag uses green, blue, and white elements to symbolise Whitireia and the harbour. It also incorporates Porirua's coat of arms, though there is also a version without the coat of arms for less formal occasions.
	1982–present	Flag of Upper Hutt	The flag consists of the shield of the city's coat of arms over a gold cross on a maroon field.
	1962–present	Flag of Wellington	Black symmetric cross on a yellow background with a central circular design of a ship with a dolphin on its sail.
	2015–present	Flag of Whanganui	The flag consists of the council's coat of arms with the Māori and English names of the council beneath it in white, all on a blue field.

== Māori flags ==
Flag	Date	Use	Description
	1834–present	Original design of the flag of the United Tribes of New Zealand, widely used by Māori groups	Similar to the amended design used as the de facto national flag 1835–1840, but with eight-pointed stars and black fimbriation in the canton.
	1990–present	Flag of Tino rangatiratanga – official national Māori flag, approved by the NZ Cabinet in 2010	A white curling stripe on a red and black field.
	–2007	Standard of Dame Te Atairangikaahu	Adopted during the reign of Dame Te Atairangikaahu (reign from 1966 to 2006).
	2009–2024	Standard of King Tūheitia	On a blue field, the crest of the Kīngitanga coat of arms in black and white.
	?–present	The flag of the Kīngitanga	On a red field, the crest of the Kīngitanga coat of arms with the motto KO TE MANA MOTUHAKE beneath it, both in gold.
		Kotahitanga flag – unofficial Māori flag, widely used by Māori groups	Three horizontal stripes of red, white, and black, defaced with a circular emblem featuring a mere crossed with a scroll representing the Treaty of Waitangi within a border of koru containing the word "Kotahitanga" (unity).
		Example of a Māori Flag	Some Māori tribes use the Red Ensign defaced with their tribal name.
	1864	Flag used in the Battle of Gate Pā	A red field with a white Greek cross on its upper hoist, a four-pointed white star (ascending Star of Bethlehem) on its lower fly, and a downward white crescent (new moon) in the centre.
	1977	Flag used at the Bastion Point demonstration against the New Zealand Crown's occupation of the land	Two horizontal stripes of red and black defaced with a mangopare (hammerhead shark) design, representing tenacity.

== Sporting flags ==
Flag	Date	Use	Description
	1908–1912	Flag of the Australasian team at the 1908 and 1912 Olympic Games	A Blue Ensign defaced by a white circle containing the British Crown plus a shield containing the Southern Cross.
	1994–present	Flag of the New Zealand Olympic Committee	A white flag with a depiction of the silver fern superimposed on the five ringed emblem of the International Olympic Committee.
	1979–1994	Flag of the New Zealand Olympic and Commonwealth Games Association	A black flag with a depiction (in white) of a silver fern on the Olympic rings.
	1987	Flag of the All Blacks, New Zealand's national rugby team.	A black flag with a white silver fern.
		Burgee of the Royal New Zealand Yacht Squadron	A blue triangular flag with a white cross, with the Southern Cross in the canton and a crown in the centre.
		Team flag for Aitutaki, Cook Islands at the Cook Islands Games	
		Team flag for Rarotonga, Cook Islands at the Cook Islands Games	
		Team flag for Atiu, Cook Islands at the Cook Islands Games	
		Team flag for Mangaia, Cook Islands at the Cook Islands Games	
		Team flag for Mitiaro, Cook Islands at the Cook Islands Games	
		Team flag for Mauke, Cook Islands at the Cook Islands Games	
		Team flag for Pukapuka, Cook Islands at the Cook Islands Games	
		Team flag for Tongareva, Cook Islands at the Cook Islands Games	
		Team flag for Rakahanga, Cook Islands at the Cook Islands Games	
		Team flag for Manihiki, Cook Islands at the Cook Islands Games	
		Team flag for Palmerston, Cook Islands at the Cook Islands Games	

== Other New Zealand flags ==
Flag	Date	Use	Description
		Flag of the New Zealand Navy Board	A fouled anchor on a red-blue vertical bicolor.
	1970–2022	Queen's Colour of the Royal New Zealand Navy	
	1900–1987	New Zealand Post flag	Blue field with the New Zealand Post Office emblem.
		Flag of the Grand Orange Lodge of New Zealand (Orange Institution)	Based on the Boyne Standard, orange ensign with the Saint George's Cross in the canton, and in the fly an open book surmounted by a Saint Edward's Crown and surrounded by the four stars of the New Zealand Southern Cross.
		Flag of the Taranaki Rifle Volunteers	
	1910	Flag of New Zealand taken to Antarctica	Presented by the pupils of Lyttelton District High School to the ship Terra Nova, as part of a fundraising drive for Robert Falcon Scott's expedition to the South Pole. It was flown from the Terra Nova's mast when the ship departed from Lyttelton on 26 November 1910.

== Sources ==
- Malcolm Mulholland (2016). "New Zealand Flag Facts" (PDF). New Zealand Flag Consideration Panel.
