= Flag of the governor-general of New Zealand =

Official flag in New Zealand

Flag of the governor-general of New Zealand, adopted in 2008

The flag of the governor-general of New Zealand is an official flag of New Zealand and is flown continuously on buildings and other locations when a governor-general is present. The flag in its present form was adopted in 2008 and is a blue field with the shield of the New Zealand coat of arms royally crowned. The official heraldic description is "A flag of a blue field thereon the Arms of New Zealand ensigned by the Royal Crown all proper".

== History ==
=== New Zealand as self-governing colony ===
The flag flown above Parliament for the inauguration of Anand Satyanand as governor-general (2006)

New Zealand was established as the Colony of New Zealand, separate from New South Wales, in 1841. The colony became self-governing in 1853 following the passing of the New Zealand Constitution Act 1852. In 1869 the Admiralty directed that "Governors ...administering the Governments of British Colonies and Dependencies be authorised to fly the Union Jack, with the Arms or Badge of the Colony emblazoned in the centre thereof". There was at the time no colonial badge for New Zealand. Accordingly, in October 1869 the decision was made of including a Jack with the "Southern Cross, as represented in the Blue Ensign by four five-pointed red stars in the fly, with white borders to correspond to the colouring of the Jack; in the Jack by four five-pointed white stars on the red ground of the St George's Cross; and in the pendant by four stars near the staff similar to those in the Ensign".

In October 1874 Sir James Fergusson announced "... that the seal or badge to be worn in the Union Jack used by the governor of New Zealand when embarked in any boat or other vessel shall be the Southern Cross as represented by four five-pointed red stars emblazoned on the white shield aforesaid, and the monogram NZ in red letters in the centre of the Southern Cross."

Succeeding governors found it convenient to use this flag on shore and it became accepted as the official viceregal flag.

=== New Zealand as dominion and, later, realm ===
In 1907 New Zealand's status was officially transformed from self-governing colony to dominion. To mark the transition to independence, the New Zealand Government recommended that the garland of laurels on the governor's flag should be replaced by one of fern leaves; the fern leaf was already recognised as one of New Zealand's national symbols. In a letter of 5 January 1908 the governor requested that the garland around the badge on his flag be changed from the usual green laurel leaves to a garland of fern leaves, and referred to the garland of maple leaves surrounding the badge on the flag of the governor general of Canada as a precedent. This was approved without hesitation, since the regulations only stipulated that the device on the flags of governors should be surrounded by a "green garland"—the type of leaves was not specified.

A new design was approved in January 1931, to reflect the Balfour Declaration of 1926 whereby the governor-general was now the representative of the monarch in the Dominion of New Zealand, rather than a representative of the British government. The New Zealand badge was replaced by the Royal Crest. The words "Dominion of New Zealand" were displayed on a gold scroll beneath the badge. As neither Governor-General Lord Bledisloe nor his ministers were sympathetic to the change, the old flag was retained, and the new flag was not flown until after Lord Galway's arrival in 1937.

Minor stylistic changes were made around 1953, including changing the scroll's text to simply "New Zealand", since New Zealand was no longer styled as a dominion.

==== Current design ====
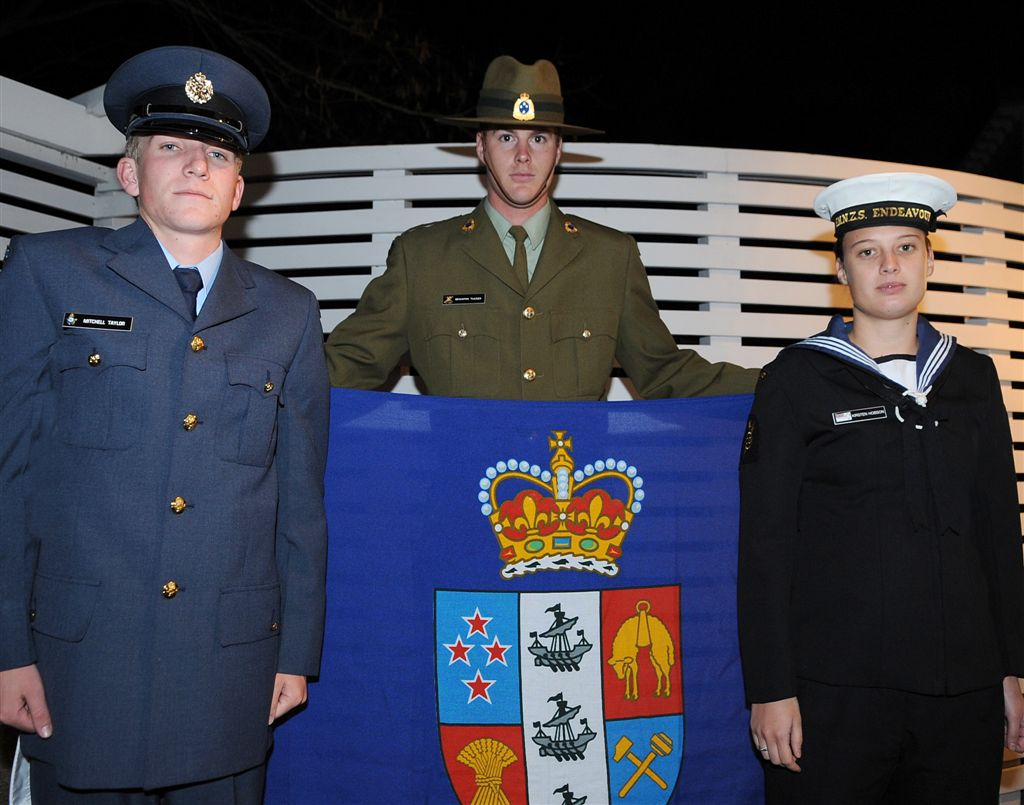
The current flag was first flown on 5 June 2008. Pictured with the flag are the three military personnel who raised the new flag and lowered the old.

On 2 June 2008 a new design was adopted, the timing coinciding with the official observance of the Queen's birthday. It is a blue field featuring the shield of the coat of arms surmounted by a Royal Crown (depicted as St Edward's Crown) in the centre. The previous design was deemed to be too 'colonial' and lacking in New Zealand elements.

The new design was flown for first time at ceremonies at Government House, Auckland on 5 June 2008 and at Government House, Wellington on 17 June 2008.

== Usage ==
The flag of the governor-general occupies the same position in New Zealand that a royal standard does in the United Kingdom. It is flown at places the governor-general occupies or resides such as the governor-general's residence, or Parliament House while attending Executive Council meetings. It is also displayed on official vehicles transporting the governor-general.

The flag of the governor-general takes precedence over the national flag of New Zealand and was second only to the Queen's Personal New Zealand Flag.

== Legal ==
The flag is protected under the Flags, Emblems, and Names Protection Act 1981, Section 12(1) states:

Every person commits an offence against this Act who, without the authority of Her Majesty or (as the case may require) the Governor-General, displays or exhibits or otherwise uses any representation to which this subsection applies in such a manner as to be likely to cause any person to believe that he does so under the authority, sanction, approval, appointment, or patronage of Her Majesty or the Governor-General.

According to Section 12(2)(d), this applies to, among others, "any representation of the Governor-General’s flag".

== Historical versions ==
Flag	Date	Description
	1869–1874	Flag of the governor of New Zealand. The Union Jack defaced with four white stars in the form of a cross.
	1874–1908	Flag of the governor of New Zealand. The Union Jack defaced with a white circle with four red stars and the initial 'NZ' in the center. The whole surrounded by a green wreath.
	1908–1936	Flag of the governor of New Zealand. The Union Jack defaced with a white circle with four red stars and the initial 'NZ' in the center. The whole surrounded by a wreath of fern.
	1936–1947	Flag of the governor-general of New Zealand. The crest from the royal coat of arms of the United Kingdom, a crowned lion standing on the Tudor Crown. With 'Dominion of New Zealand' in a scroll below.
	1947–1953	Flag of the governor-general of New Zealand. The crest from the royal coat of arms of the United Kingdom, a crowned lion standing on the Tudor crown. With 'New Zealand' in a scroll below.
	1953–2008	Flag of the governor-general of New Zealand. The crest from the royal coat of arms of the United Kingdom, a crowned lion standing on the St. Edward's crown. With 'New Zealand' in a scroll below.
	2008–present	Flag of the governor-general of New Zealand. The shield and crest of New Zealand’s coat of arms.

== See also ==
- List of New Zealand flags
- Queen's Personal New Zealand Flag
