= Queen Elizabeth II Memorial Day =

2022 public holiday in New Zealand

Queen Elizabeth II Memorial Day was a one-off public holiday that occurred in New Zealand on 26 September 2022. It was observed to mourn the death of Elizabeth II, who reigned as Queen of New Zealand from 1952 to 2022. Prime Minister Jacinda Ardern said that it was a way to allow people to pay their respects and for communities around the country to come together and pay tribute with local events.

On the same day as the holiday, a State Memorial Service was held in Wellington Cathedral of St Paul for the Queen. National mourning went from the day of her death up until the end of the memorial service.

South Canterbury Anniversary Day, which was due to be observed on 26 September in the Timaru, Waimate and Mackenzie districts, was moved to Friday 11 November.

== Legislation ==
On 12 September 2022, just days after the death of New Zealand's longest-reigning monarch, Queen Elizabeth II, Prime Minister Jacinda Ardern announced a one-off public holiday in the Queen's honour. "As New Zealand's Queen and much loved Sovereign for over 70 years, it is appropriate that we mark her life of dedicated public service with a State Memorial Service and a one-off public holiday", Ardern said. All political parties were consulted on the decision regarding the holiday.

The Queen Elizabeth II Memorial Day Bill was introduced in the New Zealand Parliament, a week later, on 19 September 2022. The bill was passed by parliament the next day. The Queen Elizabeth II Memorial Day Act 2022 received royal assent on 21 September. Under the provisions of the act, 26 September 2022 was to be observed as a day of commemoration "in acknowledgement of the long and dedicated service of Her Majesty Queen Elizabeth II to New Zealand". Normal Public Holiday requirements under the Holidays Act 2003 applied to Queen Elizabeth II Memorial Day. No additional shop trading restrictions applied to the day and the normal rules applied for employees who work on a public holiday.

== Closures across the country ==
Queen Elizabeth II Memorial Day was treated as a public holiday under the Holidays Act 2003: employees received a day off, and schools were closed. The opening of shops and sale of liquor was not restricted.

In Auckland, libraries; community, research, and arts centres closed. Most council facilities either closed or operated with reduced hours. In Wellington, all council pools, recreation centres and libraries closed. The Wellington Cable Car and ASB sports centre had reduced hours. In Christchurch and Hamilton, city and council libraries closed.

Rubbish and recycling collection days were shifted back a day in Auckland. The due dates for payments to the New Zealand Customs Service were also delayed by a day.

== State Memorial Service ==
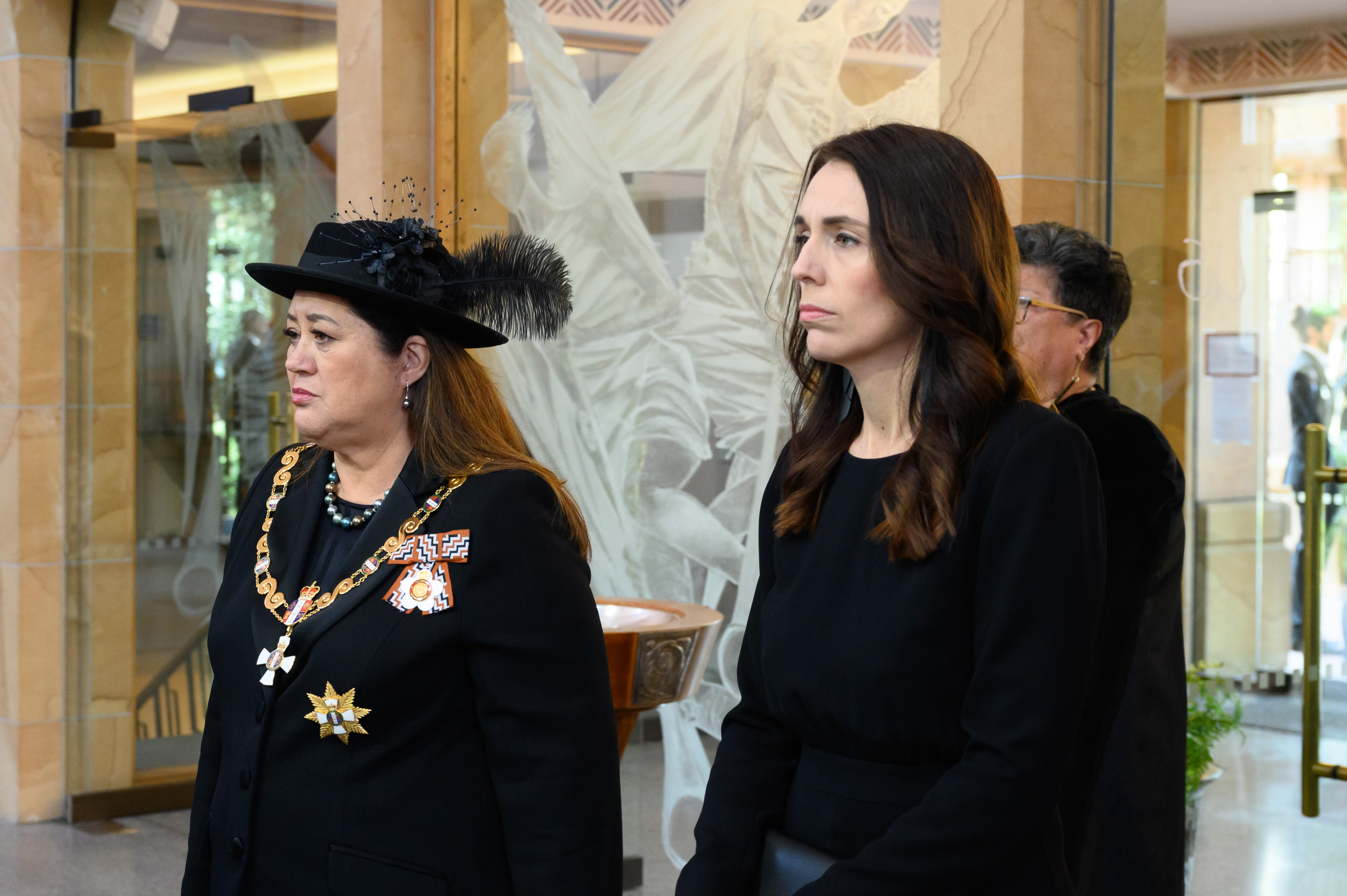
Governor-General Dame Cindy Kiro arriving with Prime Minister Jacinda Ardern at the State Memorial Service

A State Memorial Service for Queen Elizabeth II took place at the Wellington Cathedral of St Paul at 14:00 and was televised and live-streamed.

Music before the service included "Funeral March No 1" by Johann Walch, "Dido's Lament by Henry Purcell, "O Valiant Hearts" by Charles Harris, "Elegy (from A Downland Suite)" by John Ireland, "Canterbury Chorale" by Jan Van Der Roost, "Elegy" by George Dyson, "Only in Sleep" by Ēriks Ešenvalds, and "Solemn Melody" by Henry Walford-Davies. Tom Chatterton, Assistant Organist of the cathedral, played: "Prelude and Fugue in E flat BWV 552" by JS Bach (1685-1750), "Rhapsody No 1 in D flat, Op 17, No 1" by Herbert Howells, "O Welt Ich Muß Dich Lassen, Op 122, No 11" by Johannes Brahms, "Psalm Prelude, Set 1, No 2, Op 32, No 2" by Howells, "Folk Tune from Five Short Pieces" by Percy Whitlock, and "Elegy" by C. Hubert H. Parry. After a procession of various representatives, the Sovereign's Collar of the New Zealand Order of Merit was received by the Acting Dean and placed on the Table of Remembrance. The Queen's Personal New Zealand Flag, draped with mourning ribbons, was placed on the High Altar.

The Sovereign's Collar of the New Zealand Order of Merit was received by the Acting Dean Canon Katie Lawrence, and was placed on the Table of Remembrance

A national minute of silence took place at the beginning of the service, with people across New Zealand being invited to participate in the moment of silence. After the welcome and opening prayer and the Karakia, the National Anthem "God Defend New Zealand" was played.

In the bidding, Canon Katie Lawrence, Acting Dean of Wellington Cathedral of St Paul, and Justin Duckworth, Bishop of Wellington, paid tribute "to a greatly loved Queen" for her "steadfast pilgrimage of faith", her "example of service", and for "the duty which she rendered unflinchingly to her country and the Commonwealth".

After the singing of a hymn by Shirley Erena Murray, Prayers and Act of Remembrance were led by Don Rangi, Archdeacon, Te Upoko o Te Ika; Waitohiariki Quayle, Te Amorangi ki Te Upoko o Te Ika; and Cardinal John Dew, Roman Catholic Archbishop of Wellington and Metropolitan of New Zealand; to make "personal thanksgiving to God for the life of Elizabeth, our Queen". Following the Lord's Prayer, Prime Minister Jacinda Ardern read an extract from the "Royal Visit to New Zealand", describing the Queen and Prince Philip's departure from Bluff at the end of the 1953-54 royal visit to New Zealand.

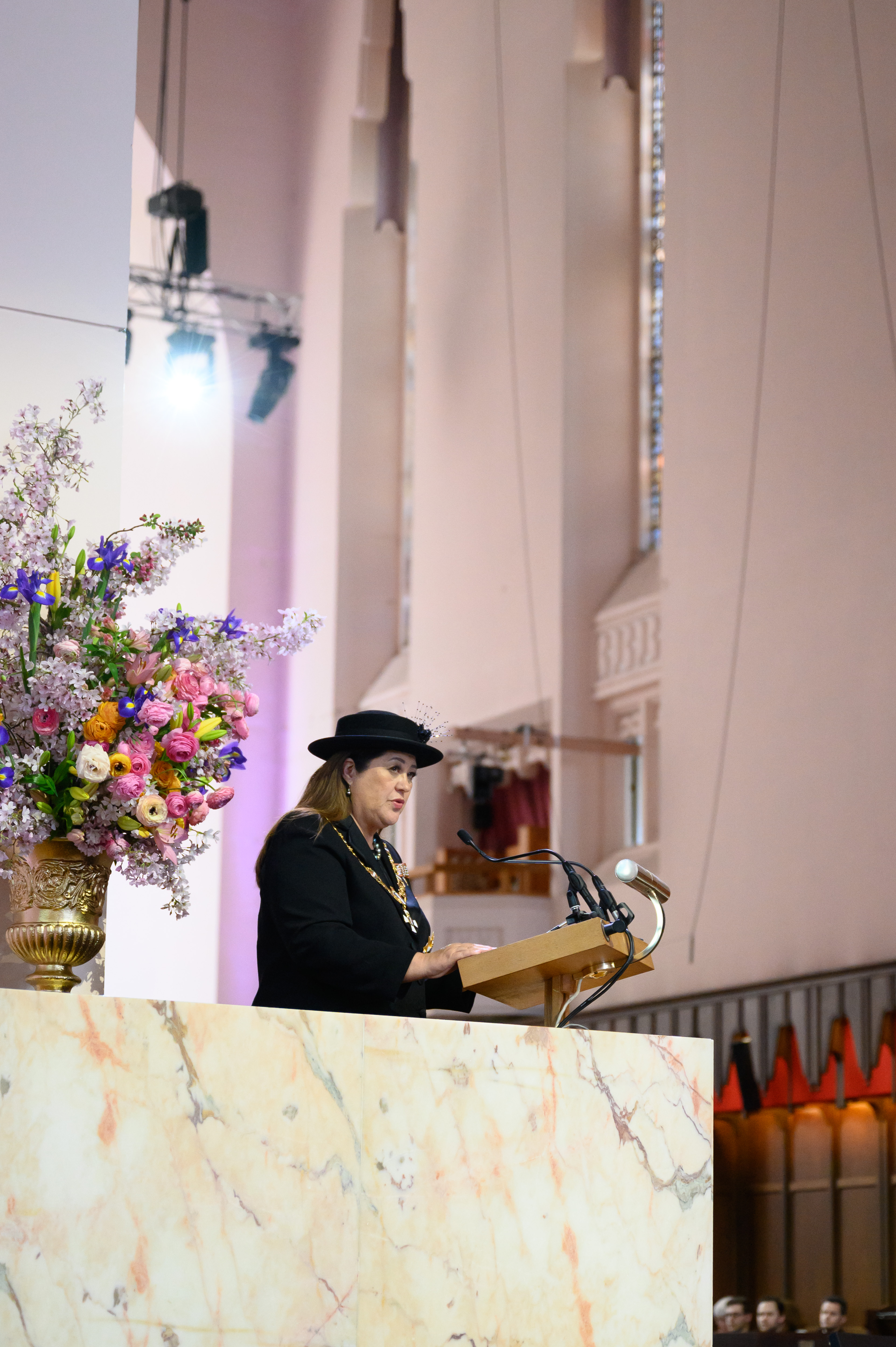
Dame Cindy Kiro reading her address at the State Memorial Service

Following the singing of "Hine e Hine", Erana Ngarimu, Head Girl of St Mary's College, read the Gospel, John 10: 11-16. This was followed by the singing of "The Lord's My Shepherd", which was sung at the wedding of Princess Elizabeth and Philip Mountbatten in 1947. The Governor-General, Dame Cindy Kiro, then gave an address and paid tribute to the Queen. She said:

In her role as Sovereign, the Queen supported over six-hundred charities, whose work provided comfort to the lonely, the sick, and the marginalised – and helped to protect our natural world. She recognised extraordinary individuals from throughout the Realm of New Zealand, including those often hidden in our communities, who quietly commit their lives to the service of others. And she strove to faithfully serve all the peoples of the Commonwealth, to whom she pledged her life. In fulfilling those duties she inherited from her father – who she loved so dearly and lost so young – the Queen asked of us, simply, to have faith in her commitment, and to pray for her continued wisdom and strength. In return, our Queen gave us a lifetime of dedicated service.

A pictorial montage of the Queen's visits to New Zealand was accompanied by the choir singing "Behold, O God our Defender", which was composed for the Queen's coronation in 1953. The Queen's New Zealand styles and titles were then read out by Phillip O'Shea, New Zealand Herald of Arms Extraordinary, as follows:

The Royal style and titles of Her Late Majesty, for use in relation to New Zealand and all other territories for whose foreign relations

Her Government in New Zealand is responsible, were—

Elizabeth the Second, by the Grace of God Queen of New Zealand and Her Other Realms and Territories, Head of the Commonwealth, Defender of the Faith.

Sovereign of The Order of New Zealand, Sovereign of The New Zealand Order of Merit, and Sovereign of The Queen's Service Order.

Now, it is upon His Majesty King Charles III, King of New Zealand, that these styles, titles and honours have devolved.

God save the King!

The National Anthem "God Save the King" was then sung. The Queen's personal flag for New Zealand was then paraded for the last time. The lament "My Home" was played by Piper SGT Murray Mansfield. The Blessing and Dismissal were given by Justin Duckworth.

Memorial services were also held elsewhere in New Zealand including in Auckland, Christchurch, New Plymouth and Hastings.

== South Canterbury Anniversary Day ==
The holiday fell on the same day as the South Canterbury Anniversary Day. Because two holidays were on the same day, local authorities had the option of moving South Canterbury Anniversary Day. Employees only got one day off despite both holidays falling on the same day. This is under s44 Holidays Act 2003. Three local authorities in South Canterbury held polls to decide on how this issue should be addressed. After 8,000 responses, they determined that the day be temporarily moved to 11 November, which was on the same day as Canterbury Anniversary Day.
