= Flag of New Zealand =

New Zealand
- Use: National flag and state ensign
- Proportion: 1:2
- Adopted: 24 March 1902; 124 years ago (in use since 1869)
- Design: A Blue Ensign with a Union Jack in the first quarter and four five-pointed red stars with white borders on the fly representing the Southern Cross.
- Designed by: Albert Hastings Markham
- Use: Civil ensign
- Proportion: 1:2
- Design: A Red Ensign with a Union Jack in the first quarter and four five-pointed white stars on the fly representing the Southern Cross.

The flag of New Zealand (Māori: te haki o Aotearoa), also known as the New Zealand Ensign, is based on the British maritime Blue Ensign – a blue field with the Union Jack in the canton or upper hoist corner – augmented or defaced with four red stars centred within four white stars, representing the Southern Cross constellation.

New Zealand's first internationally accepted national flag, the flag of the United Tribes of New Zealand, was adopted in 1834, upon the Declaration of the Independence of New Zealand, six years before the New South Wales colony's administration of British subjects in New Zealand lapsed through the creation of a new and separate colony following the signing of the Treaty of Waitangi in 1840. Chosen by an assembly of Māori chiefs at Waitangi in 1834, the flag was of a St George's Cross with another cross in the canton containing four stars on a blue field. After the formation of the colony in 1840, British ensigns began to be used.

The current flag was designed and adopted for use on the colony's ships in 1869, was quickly adopted as New Zealand's national flag, and given statutory recognition in 1902 by the New Zealand Ensign Act 1901 (No. 74). Since the 1970s there has been debate about changing the flag. In 2016, a two-stage binding referendum on a flag change took place. Voting in the second stage closed on 24 March, with the country electing to keep the existing flag by 57% to 43%.

== Design ==
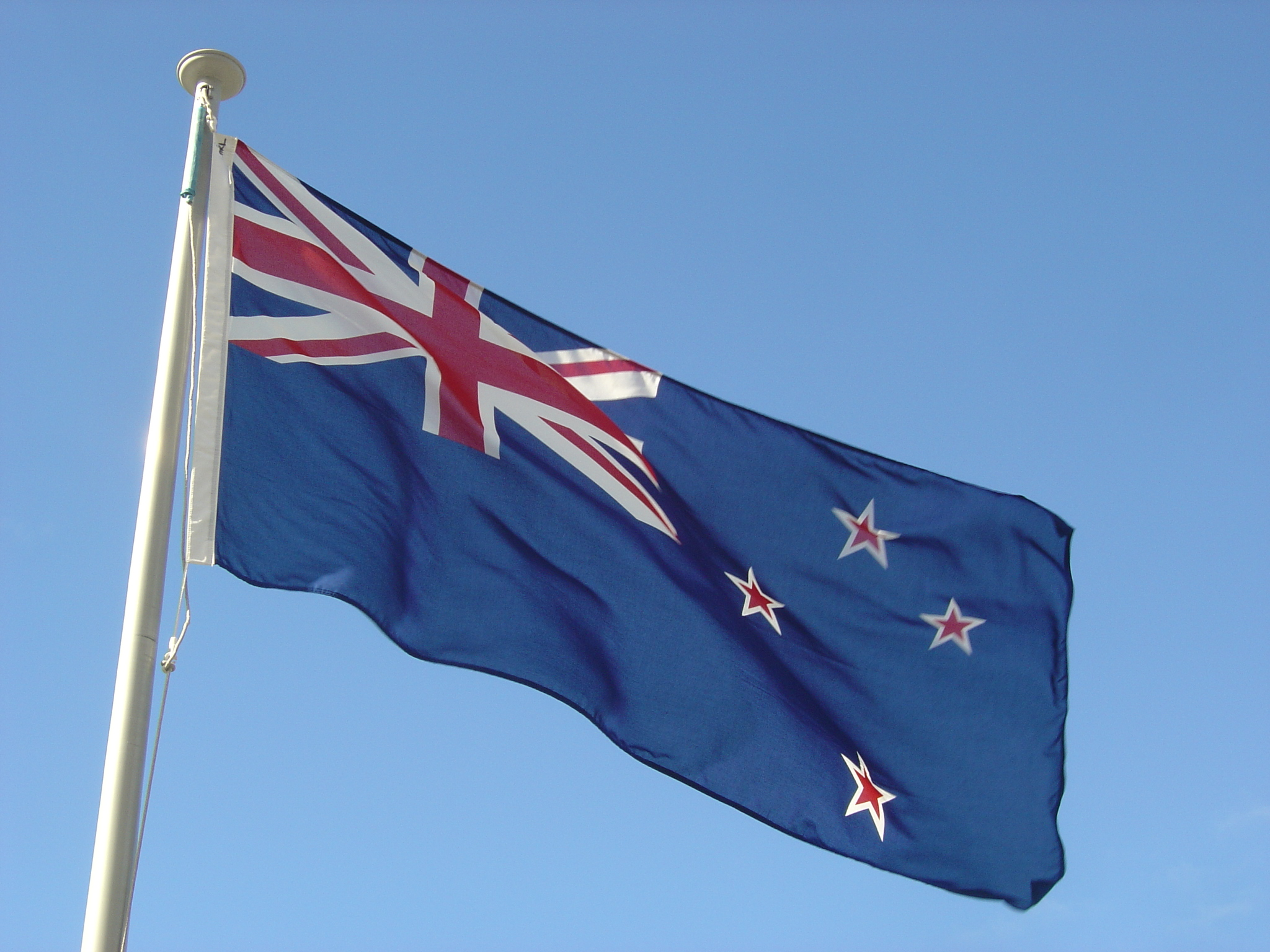
The flag of New Zealand flying outside the Beehive in Wellington

=== Devices ===
Constituent parts of the flag of New Zealand

Flags forming the Union Jack

Southern Cross

The flag of New Zealand uses two prominent symbols:

- The Union Jack (or Union Flag) (Note: The terms "Union Jack" and "Union Flag" are both historically correct for describing the de facto national flag of the United Kingdom. Whether the term "Union Jack" applies only when used as a jack flag on a ship is a modern matter of debate. The chief vexillologist of the British Flag Institute, Graham Bartram, has stated that either name is perfectly valid whatever the purpose.)
- The Southern Cross (or Crux)

In its original usage as the flag of United Kingdom of Great Britain and Ireland, the Union Jack combined three heraldic crosses which represent the countries of the United Kingdom (as constituted in 1801):

- The red St George's Cross of England
- The white diagonal St Andrew's Cross of Scotland
- The red diagonal St Patrick's Cross of Ireland

The Union Jack reflects New Zealand's origins as a British colony.

The Southern Cross constellation is one of the striking features of the Southern Hemisphere sky, and has been used to represent New Zealand, among other Southern Hemisphere colonies, since the early days of European settlement. Additionally, in Māori mythology the Southern Cross is identified as Māhutonga, an aperture in Te Ikaroa (the Milky Way) through which storm winds escaped.

=== Specifications ===
The flag should be rectangular in shape and its length should be two times its width, translating into an aspect ratio of 1:2. It has a royal blue background with a Union Jack in the canton, and four five-pointed red stars centred within four five-pointed white stars on the fly (outer or right-hand side). The exact colours are specified as Pantone 186 C (red), Pantone 280 C (blue), and white. According to the Ministry for Culture and Heritage, the government department responsible for the flag, the royal blue background is "reminiscent of the blue sea and sky surrounding us", and the stars "signify [New Zealand's] place in the South Pacific Ocean". The New Zealand Government history website states: "Its royal blue background is derived from the ensign of the Blue Squadron of the Royal Navy."

Construction sheet

The notice that appeared in the New Zealand Gazette on 27 June 1902 gave a technical description of the stars and their positions on the New Zealand Ensign:

The centres of the stars forming the long limb of the cross shall be on a vertical line on the fly, midway between the Union Jack and the outer edge of the fly, and equidistant from its upper and lower edges; and the distance apart of the centres of the stars shall be equal to thirty-six sixtieths the hoist of the ensign.

The centres of the stars forming the short limb of the cross shall be on a line intersecting the vertical limb at an angle of 82 therewith, and rising from near the lower fly corner of the Union Jack towards the upper fly corner of the ensign, its point of intersection with the vertical line being distant from the centre of the uppermost star of the cross twelve-sixtieths of the hoist of the ensign.

The distance of the centre of the star nearest the outer edge of the fly from the point of intersection shall be equal to twelve-sixtieths of the hoist of the ensign, and the distance of the centre of the star nearest the Union Jack from the point of intersection shall be equal to fourteen-sixtieths of the hoist of the ensign.

The star nearest the fly edge of the ensign shall measure five-sixtieths, the star at the top of the cross and that nearest to the Union Jack shall each measure six-sixtieths, and the star at the bottom of the cross shall measure seven-sixtieths of the hoist of the ensign across their respective red points, and the width of the white borders to the several stars shall in all cases be equal to one one-hundred-and-twentieth of the hoist of the ensign.

== History ==
=== Early flags of New Zealand ===
Māori did not have flags until Europeans introduced them to New Zealand, when they quickly adopted them and made them part of their culture. Some Māori attached traditional woven cloth, such as paki, to their ships when participating in international trade.

The trading ship Sir George Murray, built at Horeke in the Hokianga and bought by Thomas McDonnell in 1831, later that year flew a flag of St George's cross with a blue canton charged with a half moon. The Sydney Herald called the flag "the New Zealand colours", but it may have just been McDonnell's house flag.

=== Flag of the United Tribes ===
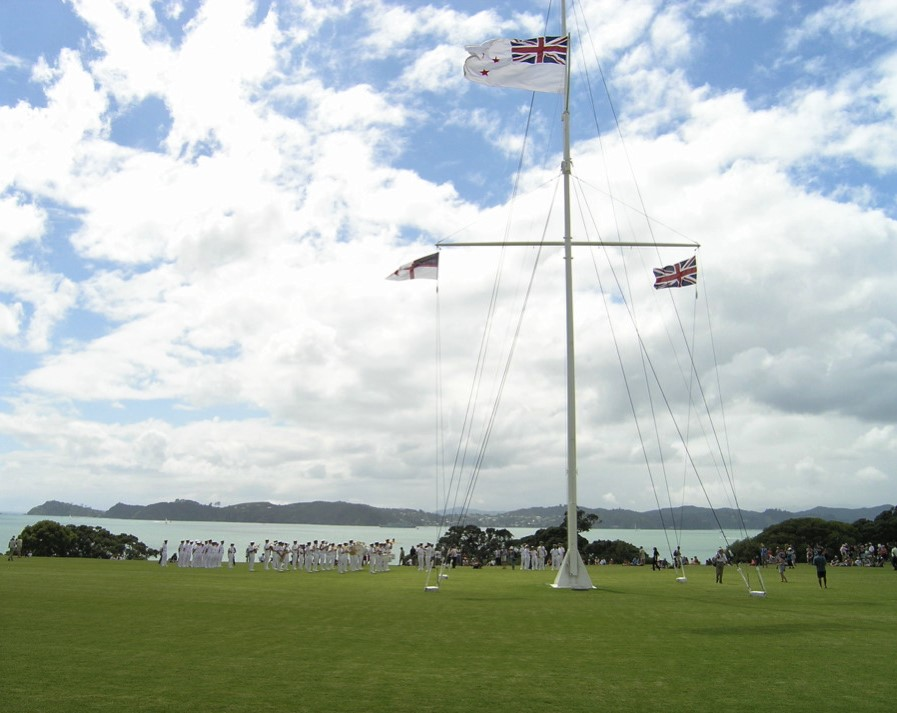
The flag pole at Waitangi, flying (left – right) the Flag of the United Tribes of New Zealand, the Ensign of the Royal New Zealand Navy and the Union Jack, 5 February 2006

The first flag of New Zealand was adopted 9 (or 20) March 1834 by a vote made by the United Tribes of New Zealand, a meeting of Māori chiefs convened at Waitangi by British resident James Busby. The United Tribes later made the Declaration of Independence of New Zealand at Waitangi in 1835. Three flags were proposed, all designed by the missionary Henry Williams, who was to play a major role in the translation of the Treaty of Waitangi in 1840. The chiefs rejected two other proposals which included the Union Jack, in favour of a modified St George's Cross or the White Ensign, which was the flag used by Henry Williams on the Church Missionary Society ships. This flag became known as the flag of the United Tribes of New Zealand and was officially gazetted in New South Wales in August 1835, with a general description not mentioning fimbriation or the number of points on the stars. (Note: "His Excellency the Governor is pleased to direct it to be notified, for general information, that a Despatch has recently been received from the Right Honorable the Secretary of State for the Colonies, conveying His Majesty's approbation of an arrangement made by this Government for complying with the wishes of the Chiefs of New Zealand to adopt a National Flag in their collective capacity, and also, of the Registrar of Vessels, built in that country, granted by the Chiefs and certified by the British Resident, being considered as valid instruments, and respected as such in the intercourse which those Vessels may hold with the British Possessions. The following is a description of the Flag which has been adopted: A Red St. George's Cross on a White ground. In the first quarter, a Red St. George's Cross on a Blue ground, pierced with four white stars.")

The United Tribes' flag is still flown on the flag pole at Waitangi, and can be seen on Waitangi Day.

National Māori flag

New Māori flag. Te Kara gained a resurgence in use from the 1970s to the turn of the 21st century, in conjunction with the modern Māori protest movement.

Flag of the United Tribes
Proposed flag not adopted by Māori; it included the Union Jack and lacked sufficient red.

Initial design of the United Tribes flag

The Flag of the United Tribes of New Zealand

=== Union Jack ===
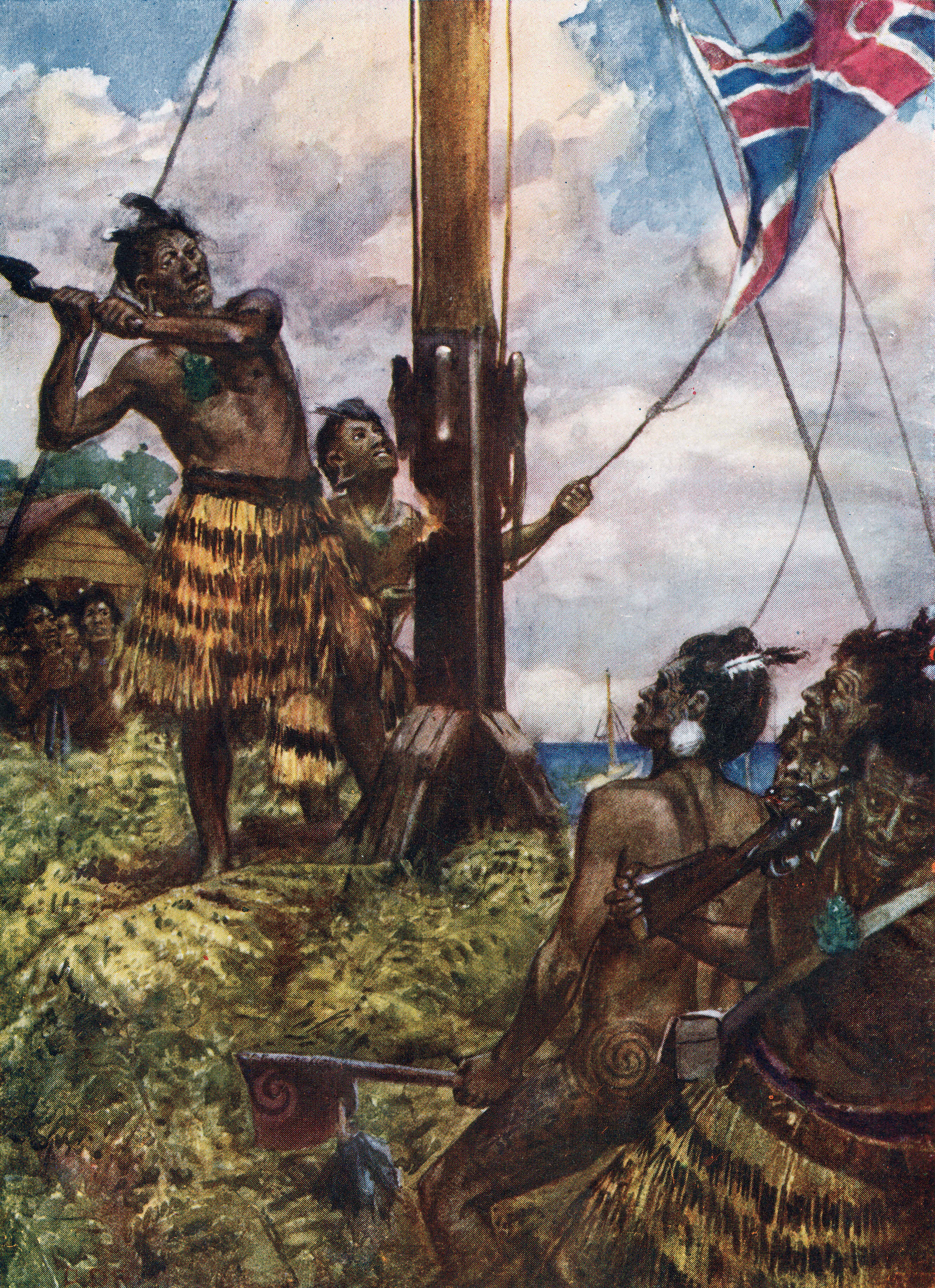
Hōne Heke cutting down the flagstaff flying the Union Jack at Kororāreka, 1844

After the signing of the Treaty of Waitangi, the Union Jack was used, although the former United Tribes flag was still used by a number of ships from New Zealand and in many cases on land. The New Zealand Company settlement at Wellington, for example, continued to use the United Tribes flag until Governor William Hobson sent a small armed force to Wellington in May 1840 (following his declaration of British sovereignty). The Union Jack, as a symbol of British authority, became the focus of the Flagstaff War which began in 1844, marking (according to some historians) the start of the New Zealand Wars.

The Union Jack was described as the "superior flag", to be flown above the New Zealand flag prior to 1965.

=== Flags based on defaced Blue Ensign ===
During the Invasion of the Waikato (July 1863 – April 1864) period of the New Zealand Wars the British forces realised they needed access to colonial ships to fight Māori. The colonial government subsequently acquired vessels which were staffed by Royal Navy officers. The vessels were under local and not Admiralty control. An armed ship, Victoria, owned by the Colony of Victoria transported reinforcements to New Zealand for the campaign and took part in bombardments of Māori. The British government was concerned about its colonies developing their own navies, not under the control of the Royal Navy's Admiralty.

This led to the British parliament passing the Colonial Naval Defence Act 1865, which allowed the colonial governments to own ships, including for military purposes, under the provision that they would have to be under the Royal Navy's command. In 1866 the British Admiralty advised colonies that if they possessed vessels governed by the Act, they must fly the Royal Navy Blue Ensign but that they must also include on the flag the seal or badge of the colony. New Zealand did not have a colonial badge, or indeed a coat of arms of its own at this stage, and so in 1867 the letters "NZ" were simply added to the blue ensign, following a decree by Governor George Grey on 15 January 1867.

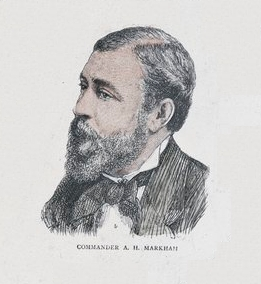
Admiral Albert Hastings Markham, designer of the flag of New Zealand

In 1869 the then First Lieutenant of the Royal Navy vessel Blanche, Albert Hastings Markham, submitted a design to Sir George Bowen, the Governor of New Zealand, for a national ensign for New Zealand. This followed a request by Bowen to Markham to come up with a new flag design, following a request to Bowen from the Colonial Office. His proposal, incorporating the Southern Cross, was approved on 23 October 1869. It was initially to be used only on government ships.

To end confusion between various designs of the flag, New Zealand's Liberal Government passed the New Zealand Ensign Act 1901, which was approved by King Edward VII on 24 March 1902.

Historical flags
The Blue Ensign

The naval flag of New Zealand, 1867–1869

The Code Signals Flag, 1899

=== Flown in battle ===
One of the first recorded accounts of the New Zealand Blue Ensign flag being flown in battle was at Quinn's Post, Gallipoli, in 1915. It was not flown officially. The flag was brought back to New Zealand by Private John Taylor, Canterbury Battalion. The first time the flag of New Zealand was flown in a naval battle and the first time officially in any battle, was from HMS Achilles during the Battle of the River Plate in 1939.

== Flag law and protocol ==
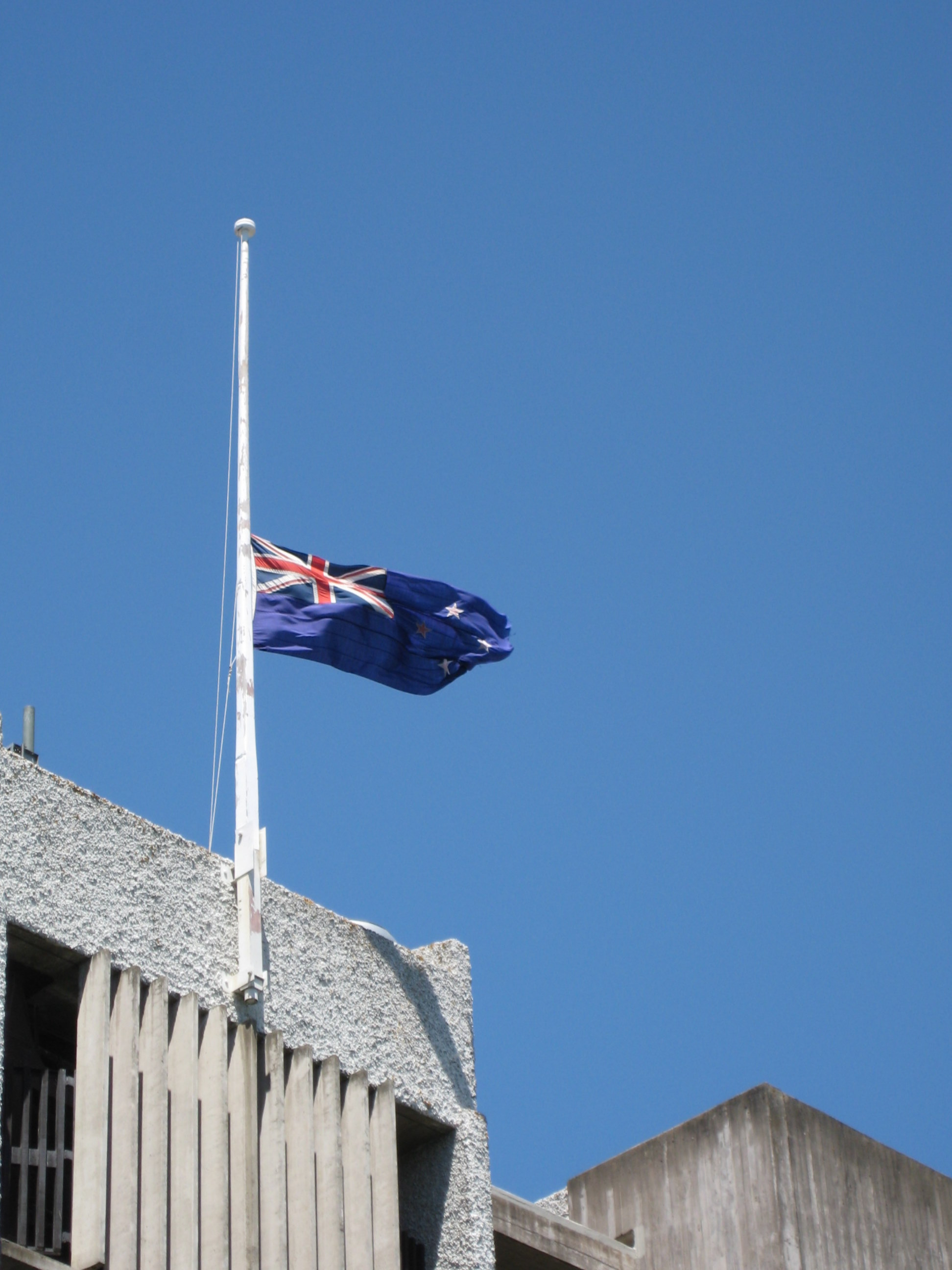
The flag flying at half-mast from the Matariki Building at University of Canterbury on the day of the death of Sir Edmund Hillary

The Flags, Emblems, and Names Protection Act 1981 governs the usage of the national flag and all other official flags. This act, like most other laws, can be amended or repealed by a simple majority in Parliament. Section 5(2) of the act declares the flag to be "the symbol of the Realm, Government, and people of New Zealand". Section 11(1) outlines two offences: altering the flag without lawful authority, and using, displaying, damaging or destroying the flag in or within view of a public place with the intention of dishonouring it.

The minister for Arts, Culture and Heritage has authority to prescribe when and how the flag should be flown and what the standard sizes, dimensions, proportions and colours should be. In its advisory role, the Ministry for Culture and Heritage has issued guidelines to assist persons in their use of the flag. No permission is needed to fly the flag, and it may be flown on every day of the year—government and public buildings with flagpoles are especially encouraged to fly the flag during working hours. However, it should never be flown in a dilapidated condition.

From November 1941 to October 1984 the Ceremony of Honouring the Flag Regulations 1941 required state schools to commemorate Waitangi, Anzac, Empire, King's birthday, Trafalgar, Armistice and Dominion Days. In 1984 the cost of flags and poles was estimated to be $340,000.

Unlike some countries there is no single official "Flag Day" in New Zealand. Flag flying may be encouraged on certain commemorative days, at the discretion of the minister for Arts, Culture and Heritage.

The flag is usually only used as a vehicle flag by certain high-ranking officeholders, including: the prime minister and other ministers; ambassadors and high commissioners (when overseas); and the chief of Defence Force. In such cases, no distinguishing defacement or fringing of the flag is used.

The flag is flown at half-mast in New Zealand—always at the discretion of the minister for Arts, Culture and Heritage—to indicate a period of mourning. Notable occasions on which the flag was half-masted include: the death of former prime minister David Lange, the death and state funeral of mountaineer Sir Edmund Hillary and the death of Queen Elizabeth II. When the flag is flown at half-mast, it should be lowered to a position recognisably at half-mast to avoid the appearance of a flag which has accidentally fallen away from the top of the flagpole; the flag should be at least its own height from the top of the flagpole.

== Debate ==
The New Zealand flag is often mistaken for the flag of Australia (pictured), since they are similar in design.

With the Union Jack in its upper left-hand quarter, the flag still proclaims New Zealand's origins as a British colony. Some New Zealanders believe a new flag would better reflect the country's independence, while others argue that the design represents New Zealand's strong past and present ties to the United Kingdom and its history as a part of the British Empire. Relatedly, debate about changing the flag has often arisen in connection with the issue of republicanism in New Zealand. The Southern Cross constellation is depicted on other flags, such as the flag of Australia—although in Australia's case there are five all-white stars and an additional larger star beneath the Union Jack canton, while New Zealand's four stars have red centres. The similar flags of Australia and New Zealand are often mistaken for each other, and this confusion was cited by the NZ Flag.com Trust as a reason for adopting a different design.

Debate on keeping or changing the New Zealand flag started before May 1973, when a remit for "New Zealand to be declared a republic, change the national flag, and the national anthem" was voted down by the Labour Party at their national conference. In November 1979 Minister of Internal Affairs Allan Highet suggested that the design of the flag should be changed, and sought an artist to design a new flag with a silver fern on the fly, but the proposal attracted little support.

In 1994 Christian Democrat MP Graeme Lee introduced a Flags, Anthems, Emblems, and Names Protection Amendment Bill. If passed, the bill would have entrenched the Act that governs the flag (see § Flag law and protocol) and added New Zealand's anthems, requiring a majority of 65 percent of votes in Parliament before any future legislation could change the flag. The bill passed its first reading but was defeated at its second reading, 26 votes to 37.

In 1998 Prime Minister Jenny Shipley backed Cultural Affairs Minister Marie Hasler's call for the flag to be changed. Shipley, along with the New Zealand Tourism Board, put forward the quasi-national silver fern flag (a silver fern on a black field, along the lines of the Canadian Maple Leaf flag) as a possible alternative flag.

On 5 August 2010 Labour list MP Charles Chauvel submitted a member's bill for a consultative commission followed by a referendum on the New Zealand flag.

=== 2015–16 referendums ===
The black, white and blue silver fern flag of the 2015 referendum designed by Kyle Lockwood

On 11 March 2014, Prime Minister John Key announced in a speech his intention to hold a referendum, during the next parliamentary term, on adopting a new flag. Key stated, "It's my belief, and I think one increasingly shared by many New Zealanders, that the design of the New Zealand flag symbolises a colonial and post-colonial era whose time has passed". Following his party's re-election that year, the details of the two referendums were announced. The first referendum was set for November 2015 allowing voters to decide on a preferred design from five choices. The second referendum would see the preferred design voted on against the current flag in March 2016.

Had the flag changed, the current flag (described as the "1902 flag") of New Zealand would have been "recognised as a flag of historical significance", and its continued use would have been permitted. Official documents depicting the current flag would have been replaced only through ordinary means, e.g. an existing driving licence would have remained valid until its renewal date.

==== Red Peak flag campaign ====
The Red Peak flag, designed by Aaron Dustin

In mid-2015, public interest coalesced around an alternative flag design known as Red Peak, created by Aaron Dustin. While Red peak was initially excluded from the Flag Consideration Panel's shortlist, the design gained widespread support through a grassroots campaign led by Trade Me co-founder Rowan Simpson. An online petition calling for its inclusion in the referendum received over 50,000 signatures. In response to this public pressure, the New Zealand Government amended Sections 5 and 13 of the Flag Referendums Act in September 2015 to allow Red Peak to be added as a fifth option in the first referendum. Despite its inclusion, Red Peak was eliminated in the third round of preferential voting, receiving 8.77% of first-preference votes.

On 11 December 2015, preliminary results were announced for the first referendum. The black, white and blue design, with a silver fern and red stars, was the winning flag. This flag design did not win the second referendum; according to preliminary results announced on 24 March 2016, the existing 1902 flag was chosen to remain the New Zealand flag. 56.7% were in favour of retaining the flag, with a voter turnout of 67.3%. 43.3% were in favour of changing the flag to the Lockwood design.

== New Zealand Red Ensign ==
The Red Ensign is mainly used as a civil ensign.

A red version of the flag, officially called the Red Ensign and nicknamed the "red duster", was adopted in 1903 to be flown on non-government ships. It was flown on New Zealand merchant ships during both world wars.

The Red Ensign has sometimes been flown incorrectly on land in the belief that it is the national flag. The Flags, Emblems, and Names Protection Act 1981 does allow for the Red Ensign to be used on land on occasions of Māori significance, continuing the long preference of Māori for the use of red in flags.

== Other New Zealand flags ==
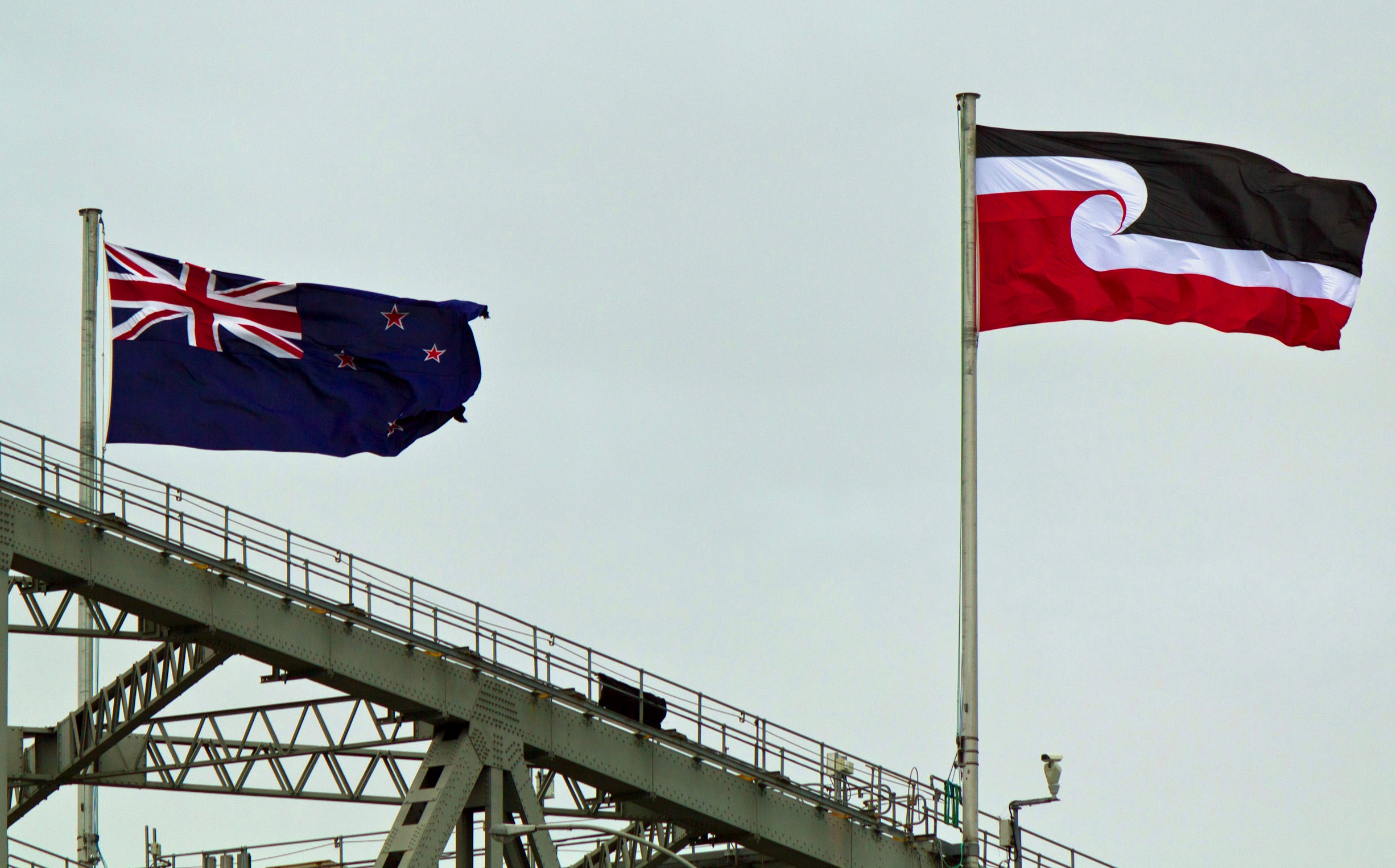
National flag alongside the tino rangatiratanga flag on Auckland Harbour Bridge on Waitangi Day, 2012

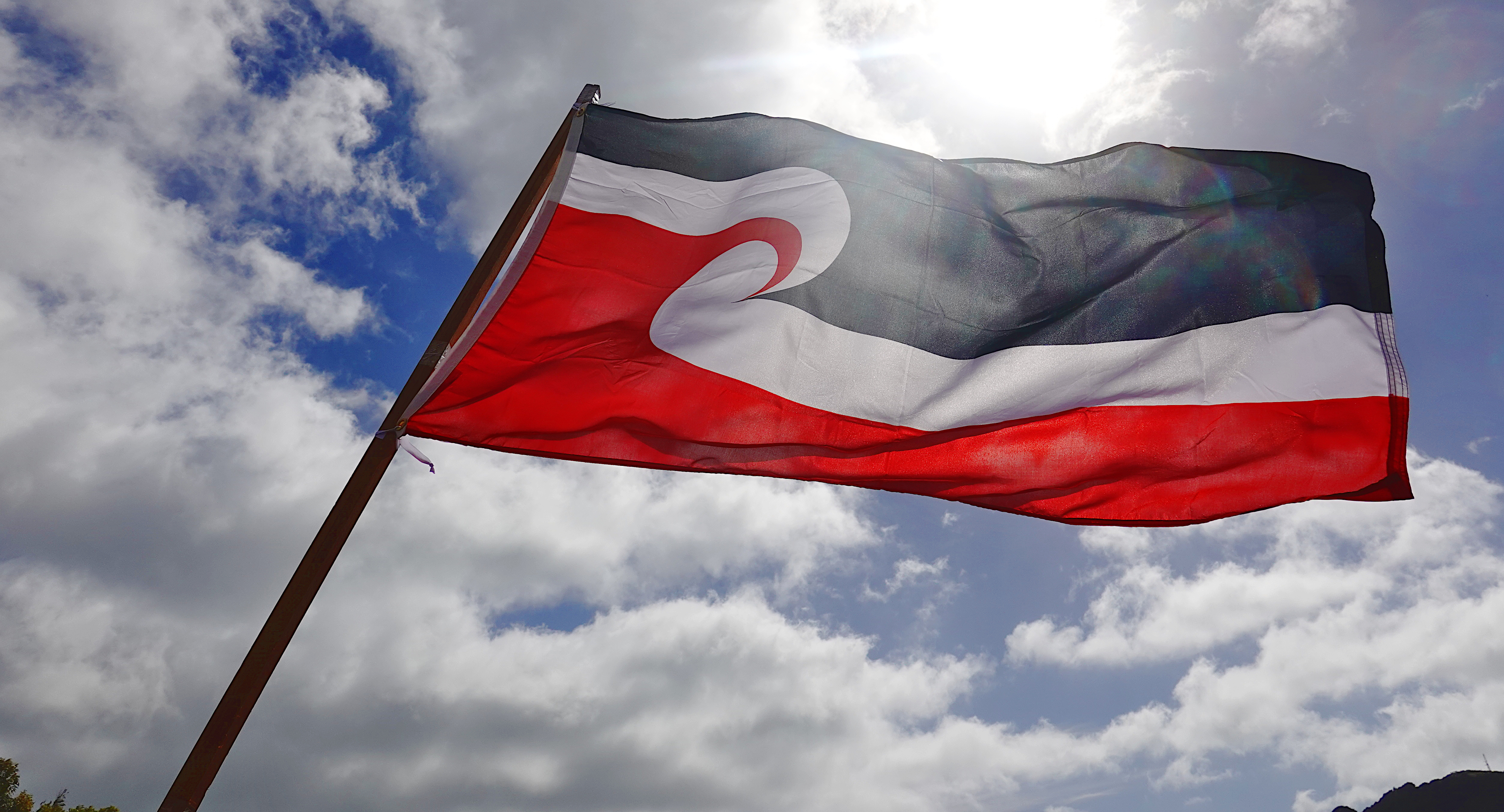
A Tino Rangatiratanga flag against the sky

The flag commonly known as the tino rangatiratanga (Māori for 'absolute sovereignty') flag was designed in 1989. It has been acknowledged as a national flag for the Māori.

There are two official flags which, when flown in the appropriate circumstance, take precedence over the national flag of New Zealand:

- The Queen's Personal New Zealand Flag, adopted in 1962, depicts the New Zealand coat of arms in banner form defaced with a roundel containing the letter 'E' and a crown. The personal flag was flown continuously on any building in which Queen Elizabeth II was in residence and by any ship that transported the Queen in New Zealand waters. Since the death of the Queen, the flag is no longer displayed.
- The flag of the governor-general of New Zealand is flown continuously in the presence of the governor-general. The flag in its present form was adopted in 2008, and is a blue banner with a shield of the New Zealand coat of arms surmounted by a crown.

In addition, the New Zealand Police, New Zealand Fire Service, New Zealand Customs Service, and the services of the New Zealand Defence Force have their own flags. A few local authorities have commissioned their own flags, such as that of the City of Nelson.

== See also ==
- Flag desecration § New Zealand
- National symbols of New Zealand
- Coat of arms of New Zealand
- Historical flags of the British Empire and the overseas territories
- Flags depicting the Southern Cross
- List of countries and territories with the Union Jack displayed on their flag
- National Māori flag, also known as the Tino Rangatiratanga flag
- Flag of the United Tribes of New Zealand
- Flag of Australia
