= Queen's Personal New Zealand Flag =

Personal flag of Elizabeth II as Queen of New Zealand

Queen's Personal Flag for New Zealand
- Use: Other
- Adopted: 11 October 1962
- Relinquished: 26 September 2022 (paraded for the last time)
- Design: The escutcheon of the coat of arms of New Zealand in banner form, defaced with a blue roundel surrounded by a garland of roses encircling a crowned letter 'E'

The Queen's Personal Flag for New Zealand was the personal flag of Elizabeth II in her role as Queen of New Zealand. It was approved for use in 1962, and was used by the Queen when she was in New Zealand. The monarch's Representative, the Governor-General of New Zealand, uses a separate flag.

== Background ==
On 11 October 1962, Queen Elizabeth II announced the adoption of a special personal flag for use on her tour of New Zealand between 6–18 February 1963 and subsequent royal visits.

== Description ==
The escutcheon of the coat of arms of New Zealand serves as basis for the flag.

The flag follows the same basic pattern used by the then Queen across several other realms since the 1960s: it is the escutcheon of a country's coat of arms (e.g. the arms of New Zealand) in banner form defaced with a device taken from her personal flag (a blue roundel surrounded by a garland of roses encircling a crowned letter 'E', all in gold).

The flag is divided into four quadrants: The first quadrant includes depicts four stars as representative of the Southern Cross constellation, as depicted on the national flag. The second quadrant consists of a golden fleece on a red field. The third quadrant contains a golden wheat sheaf on a red field. The final quadrant includes two crossed gold hammers on a blue field.

The central stripe consists of three ships. Superimposed in the centre is a dark blue roundel bearing a Roman E surmounted by a Royal Crown within a chaplet of roses, all gold-coloured, obscuring the centre ship.

The central blue disc is taken from the then Queen's Personal Flag, which was used by the Queen in relation to her role as Head of the Commonwealth.

== Usage and protocol ==
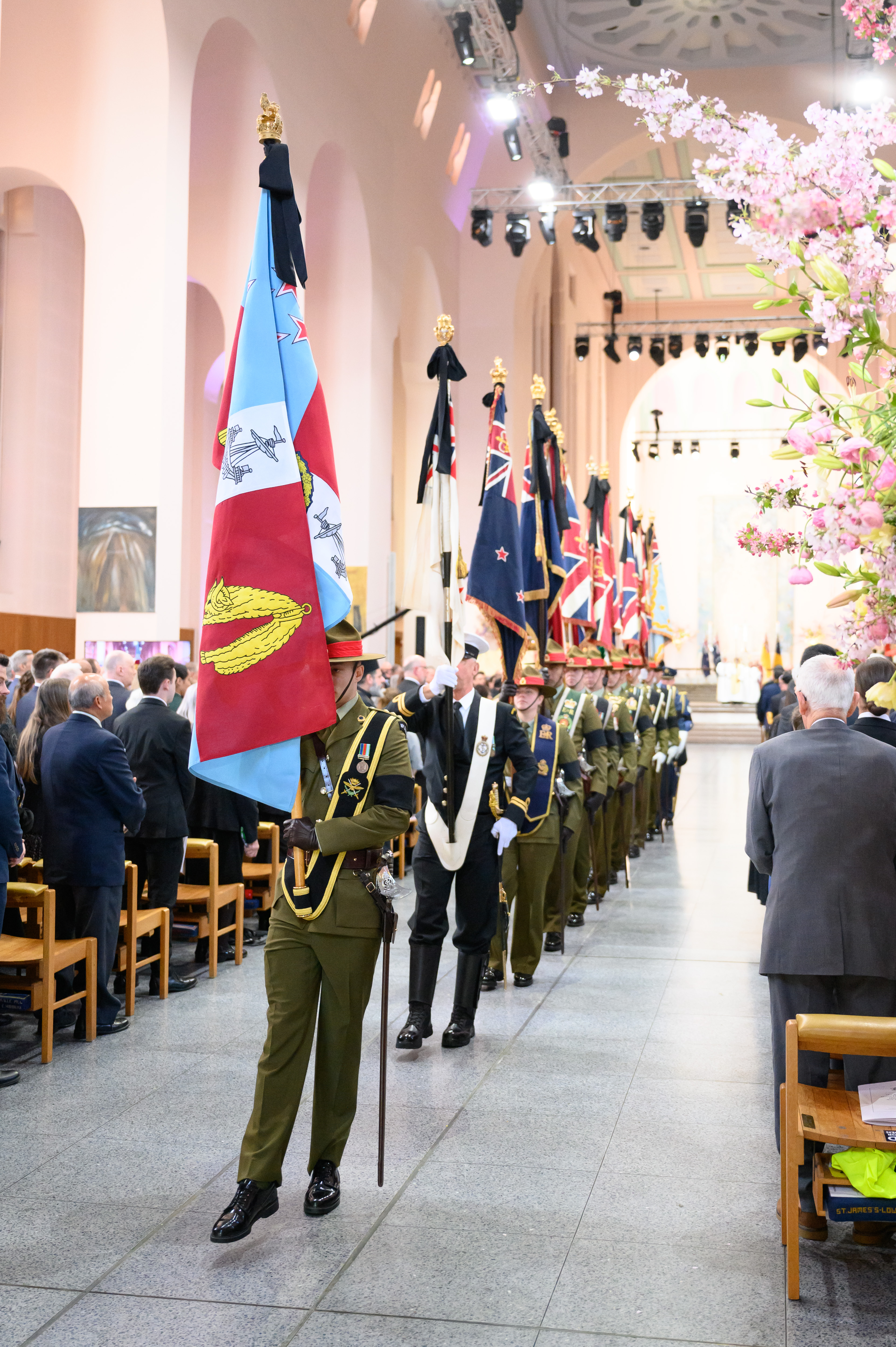
The Queen's Personal Flag for New Zealand being paraded at the State Memorial Service for Elizabeth II in 2022

The flag was flown on any building in which the Queen was in residence and by a ship transporting the Queen in New Zealand waters. It was also flown whilst the Queen was attending a state or public function, and it could be seen above the saluting base at military parades and open air gatherings when she was present. It was also broken when the Queen set foot on board one of Her Majesty's New Zealand Ships. When flown with the New Zealand Flag, the Queen's Personal Flag for New Zealand took the position of honour.

The only occasion on which the Queen's Personal Flag for New Zealand was flown in her absence was at parades in honour of her Official Birthday.

With the death of the Queen in 2022, the use of this flag ceased. The flag was paraded for the last time at the State Memorial Service for the Queen of New Zealand at the Wellington Cathedral of St Paul on 26 September 2022.

== Legal ==
The flag is protected under the Flags, Emblems, and Names Protection Act 1981, Section 12(1) states:

Every person commits an offence against this Act who, without the authority of Her Majesty or (as the case may require) the Governor-General, displays or exhibits or otherwise uses any representation to which this subsection applies in such a manner as to be likely to cause any person to believe that he does so under the authority, sanction, approval, appointment, or patronage of Her Majesty or the Governor-General.

According to Section 12(2)(c), this applies to, among others, "any representation of the Royal Standard, or the Sovereign's personal flag for New Zealand".

== Coronation standard ==
During the coronation ceremony of the monarch at Westminster Abbey, the "standards" of various countries are carried by various officials in the procession inside the abbey. These flags are the country's coat of arms as a banner of arms. For New Zealand, unlike Canada and Australia, the banner remained the same for the King George V, King George VI and Queen Elizabeth II in 1911, 1937, and 1953, respectively. The banner was in a 3:4 ratio and without defacement. The coronation of Charles III saw representatives from the Commonwealth realms carry their respective national flag instead of a banner of arms.

Coronation standard used in 1911, 1937 and 1953

Coronation standard used in 2023

== See also ==
- Flags of Elizabeth II — for a full list of all of Queen Elizabeth II's flags
- List of New Zealand flags
- Queen's Personal Australian Flag
- Queen's Personal Canadian Flag
- Flag of the governor-general of New Zealand
