= National symbols of New Zealand =

National symbols of New Zealand are used to represent what is unique about the nation, reflecting different aspects of its cultural life and history.

== Official symbols ==
	Symbol	Image	Adopted	Remarks
Flag	Flag of New Zealand	Flag of New Zealand	24 March 1902	A Blue Ensign with the Southern Cross of four white-edged red five-pointed stars centred on the outer half of the flag.
Coat of arms	Coat of arms of New Zealand	Coat of arms of New Zealand	Adopted in 1911 and revised in 1956	The symbols on the shield represent the country's maritime trade, agriculture and industry. A European woman and a Māori chief flank the left and right sides, identifying New Zealand as a bicultural nation (European New Zealanders and Māori). The figures are supported by the silver fern, a native plant. The St Edward's Crown is a reminder that New Zealand is a constitutional monarchy.
National anthems	"God Defend New Zealand" and "God Save the King"	"God Defend New Zealand" "God Save the King"	"God Defend New Zealand" was adopted in 1977.	Both are official, though in most circumstances "God Defend New Zealand" is used as the anthem. "God Save the King" is generally used only on regal and viceregal occasions.
National colours	The national colours of New Zealand orders are black, white or silver, and red ochre.	Queens Service ribbon	New Zealand Orders have used these colours since 1975.	The national Māori flag also uses these colours, with attached symbolism. Red ochre (kokowai) has a spiritual significance in Māori culture, associated with life and vitality.

== Unofficial emblems ==
	Symbol	Image	Remarks
National bird	Kiwi (Apteryx mantelli)	North Island Brown Kiwi	The term Kiwis has been used as a nickname for New Zealanders since at least World War I, and the bird's use as a symbol for the country dates from the same era.
National plant	Silver fern (Cyathea dealbata)	Frond, showing silver underside	A species of medium-sized tree fern, endemic to New Zealand. Often referred to by its Māori name, ponga, the silver fern has been used to represent New Zealand since the 1880s.
National flower	Kōwhai (Sophora tetraptera)	Kōwhai	Evergreen tree, producing bright yellow flowers in spring. Blooms of kōwhai are found throughout New Zealand in a diverse range of habitats. The Department of Conservation notes that kōwhai is widely regarded as being the national flower.
National personification	Zealandia	Zealandia depiction	Popular in the late 19th and early 20th century. Now rarely used, other than as a supporter on the coat of arms.

== Cultural icons ==
Icons of New Zealand culture are almost as well known by New Zealanders and visitors as unofficial symbols. Certain items of popular culture thought to be unique to New Zealand are also called "Kiwiana".

	Image	Remarks
The All Blacks	All Blacks team members	The country's national rugby union team – three times world champions, and the country's best known sports team both locally and internationally.
The Beehive	The Beehive	The distinctively shaped executive wing of New Zealand Parliament Buildings, built in the 1970s.
The Black Ferns	Black Ferns	The country's national women's rugby union team – six times world champions, and one of the country's well known teams in recent years. Known both in New Zealand and globally for previous records.
Bungy jumping	Kawarau Bridge bungy	Popularised by A.J. Hackett in the South Island, it has become a popular extreme sport worldwide.
Haka	Māori haka	A traditional Māori dance, now widely used by sports teams as a challenge and by schools as a tribute or honour.
Hei-tiki	Hei-tiki	Traditional Māori ornamental pendants.
Kiwifruit	Kiwifruit	This fruit was branded kiwifruit when growers in New Zealand established successful cultivars suitable for export. It remains a major export for the country.
Koru	Korukowhaiwhai	The koru, widely used in traditional Māori art, is a stylised depiction of an unfurling silver fern frond.
The Lord of the Rings	Hobbiton Movie Set	The film trilogy (and the subsequent The Hobbit trilogy) highlighted New Zealand's natural scenery and is widely associated with the country worldwide.
Mitre Peak	Mitre Peak	A distinctive peak which dominates Milford Sound, one of the country's most popular tourist destinations.
The New Zealand Warriors		The country's national Rugby league team that competes in the NRL– though they have yet to win a premiership, they have won the minor premiership on 2 occasions and in 2025 had won the NSW Cup. One of New Zealand's well known sport's teams both within and out of the country.
Pāua	Pāua	A species of abalone. Its flesh is a delicacy, and its iridescent shell is used for ornamentation.
Pavlova	Pavlova	A meringue-based dessert with a crisp crust and soft, light inside; topped with whipped cream and fruit. Its country of origin is widely contested by Australia.
Pounamu ("Greenstone")	Kataore, Mere pounamu (42cm x 12cm)	Nephrite jade, highly valued by Māori both physically and spiritually.

== See also ==
- Kiwi (people)
- Kiwiana
- New Zealand heraldry
