= Zealandia (personification) =

National personification of New Zealand

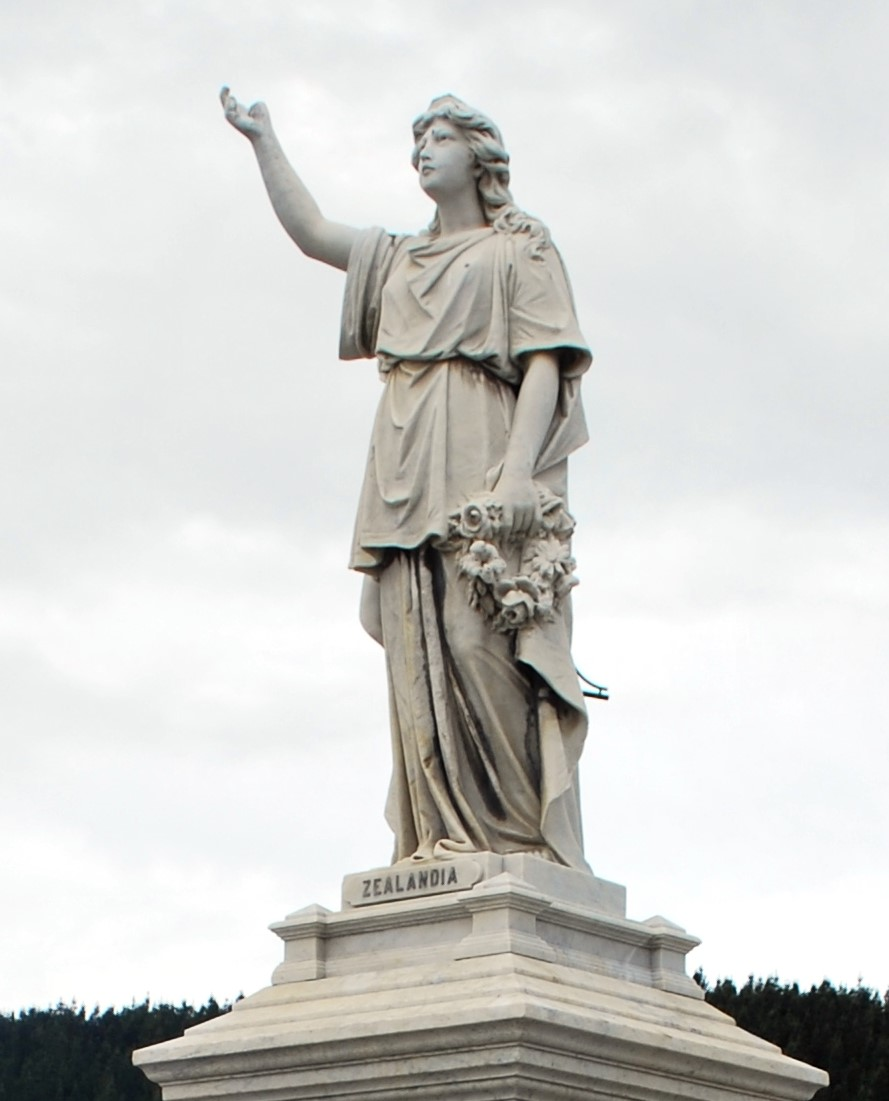
The Fallen Soldiers’ Memorial in Palmerston depicting Zealandia pointing heavenward, was unveiled in 1903.

Zealandia is a national personification of New Zealand. In her stereotypical form, Zealandia appears as an evidently Western European woman who is similar in dress and appearance to Britannia. Britannia is said to be the mother of Zealandia.

== History ==
As a direct reference to the United Kingdom and the old world, she brought a sense of history and classical respectability to the colony during the formative years as a young nation. Zealandia appeared on postage stamps, posters, cartoons, war memorials, and New Zealand government publications most commonly during the first half of the 20th century. Zealandia was a commonly used symbol of the New Zealand Centennial Exhibition, which was held in Wellington in 1939 and 1940. Four large Zealandia statues exist in New Zealand towns or cities; one is in Waimate, one is in Palmerston, and one in Symonds Street, Auckland, and one inside the Auckland War Museum. The first two (in stone) are Second Boer War memorials and the latter one (in bronze) is a New Zealand Wars memorial. Some smaller statues exist in other museums and in private hands.

=== Postage stamps ===
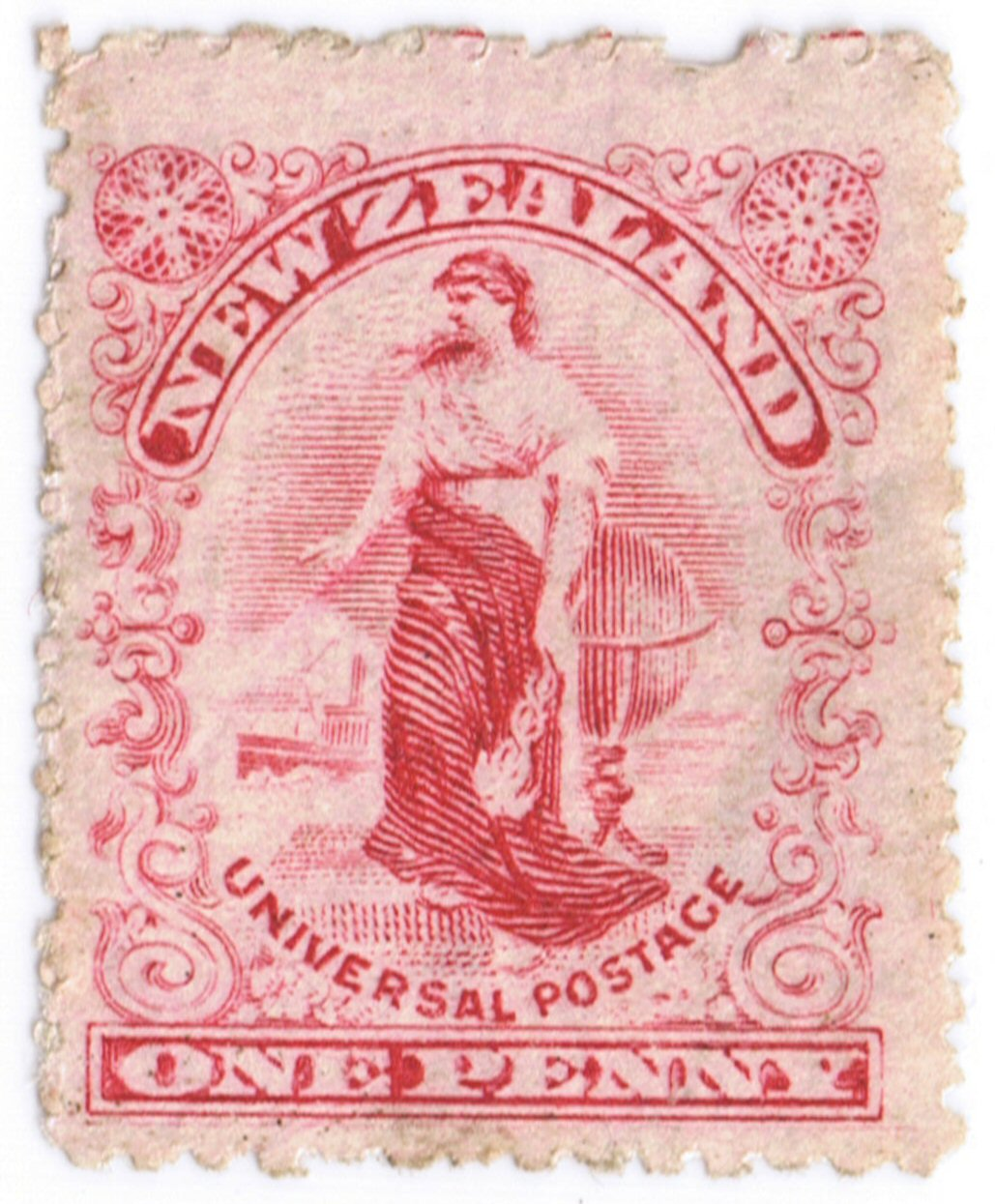
Zealandia on a 1901 postage stamp

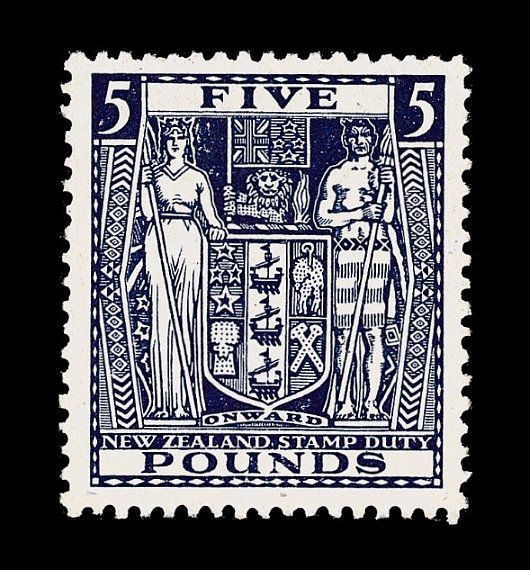
Zealandia (left) on a £5 1929 stamp

Zealandia also featured on one penny definitive postage stamps issued in 1901 and 1909 during the reign of Queen Victoria and Edward VII when it went from being a Colony to a Dominion and was also depicted on a stamp featuring the coat of arms issued in 1929.

== Coat of arms ==
The woman who appears on the left side of the coat of arms of New Zealand is Zealandia. Apart from the coat of arms, Zealandia is seldom depicted in works today, or indeed referred to.

== Image gallery ==
Zealandia on the left side of the coat of arms of New Zealand used from 1911 to 1956

Zealandia on the left side of the coat of arms of New Zealand, used currently

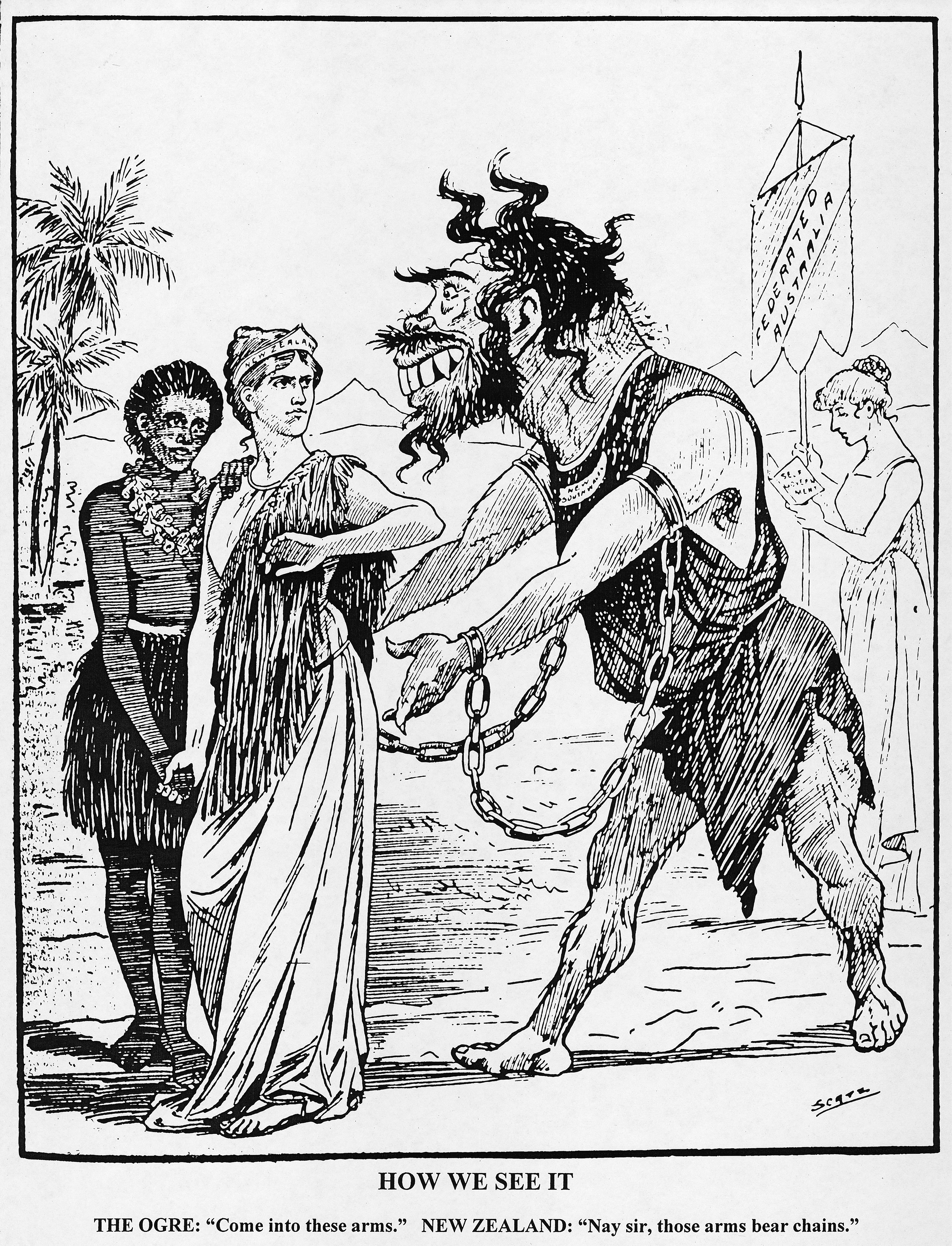
A political cartoon from 1900 using Zealandia to represent New Zealand

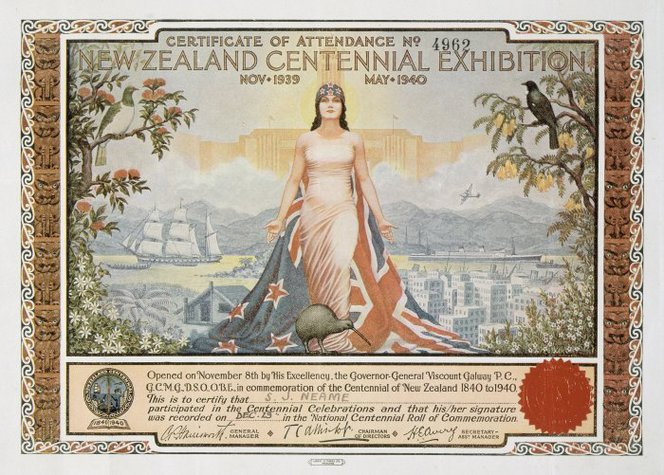
New Zealand Centennial Exhibition. c. 1939

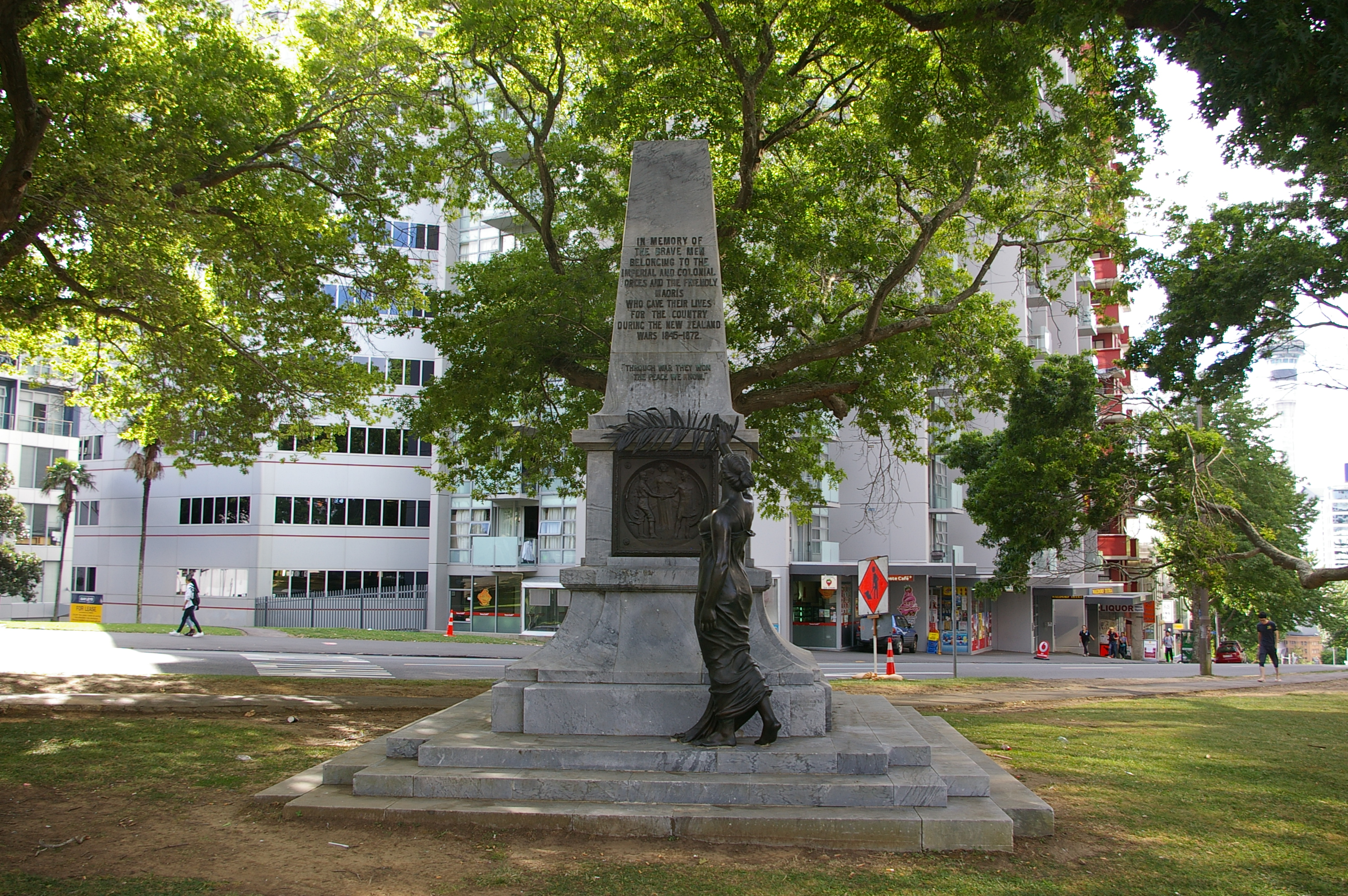
The New Zealand Wars memorial in Auckland

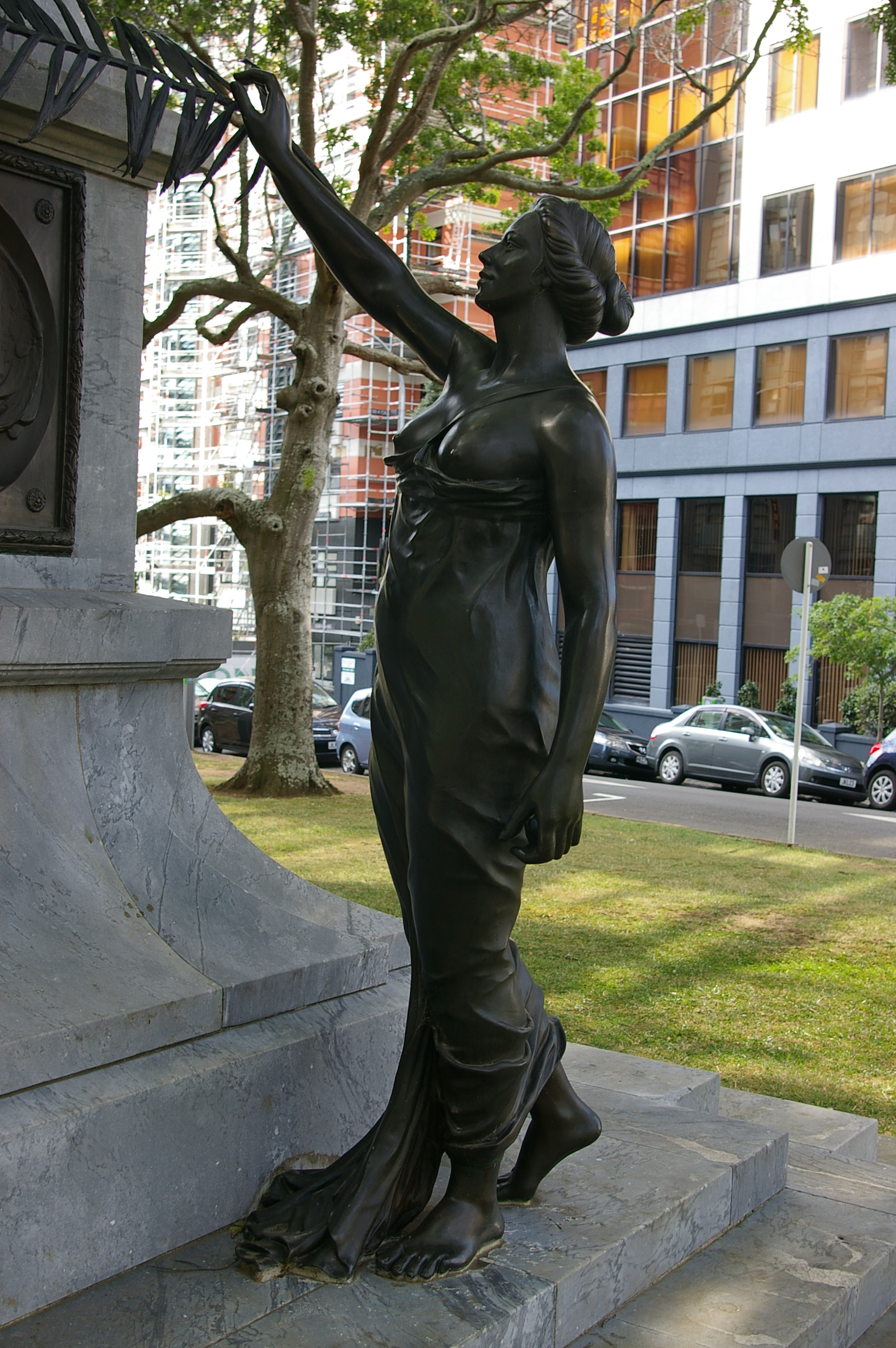
The Bronze Zealandia statue in Auckland
