= Flag of the City of Nelson =

Flag of the City of Nelson

The flag of the City of Nelson represents Nelson, New Zealand. The flag is flown from many public buildings and other landmarks in Nelson including Christ Church Cathedral. It is also intended for public use and is often seen flying from private residences in the city.

The flag was designed and commissioned by the City of Nelson Civic Trust and was adopted as the city's civic flag by the Nelson City Council in 1987.

== Design ==
The flag is based on the City of Nelson's coat of arms. The top third of the flag is blue, a colour strongly associated with Nelson including use by many sports teams. The bottom two thirds consist of alternating blue and white horizontal wavy stripes, which represent Nelson's relationship to the sea. Emblazoned upon the striped section is a black cross flory, taken from the arms of Lord Nelson. Above the cross, upon the blue section is a mitre with fringed lappets flowing from either side, for Nelson has been the seat of the bishop of Nelson since 1858.

The flag flying at Nelson Airport

== See also ==
- List of New Zealand flags
