= Coat of arms of New Zealand =

New Zealand Coat of Arms

Versions
- 1911–1956
- Armiger: New Zealand
- Shield: Quarterly: Azure and Gules on a Pale Argent three Lymphads Sable, in the first Quarter four Mullets in Cross of the last each surmounted by a Mullet of the second (representing the Constellation of the Southern Cross), in the second Quarter a Fleece, in the third a Garb, and in the Fourth two Mining Hammers in Saltire all Or.
- Supporters: On the dexter side a European female Figure proper vested Argent supporting in the dexter hand a flagstaff proper hoisted thereon the Ensign of the Dominion of New Zealand, and on the sinister side a Maori Rangatira (chieftain) vested proper holding in his dexter hand a Taiaha (halbert) all proper.
- Compartment: Silver fern leaves
- Motto: "New Zealand"

The coat of arms of New Zealand (Māori: Te Tohu Pakanga o Aotearoa) is the heraldic symbol representing the South Pacific island country of New Zealand. Its design reflects New Zealand's history as a bicultural nation, with Zealandia, a European female figure on one side and a Māori rangatira (chief) on the other. The symbols on the central shield represent New Zealand's trade, agriculture and industry, and a Crown represents New Zealand's status as a constitutional monarchy.

The arms were granted by warrant of King George V on 26 August 1911, and modified by Queen Elizabeth II in 1956. While the use of the coat of arms is restricted to the New Zealand Government, the symbol enjoys wide use on state decorations; it appears on the uniform of the police and is on the cover of the national passport.

== History ==
Until 1911, New Zealand used the same royal coat of arms as the United Kingdom.

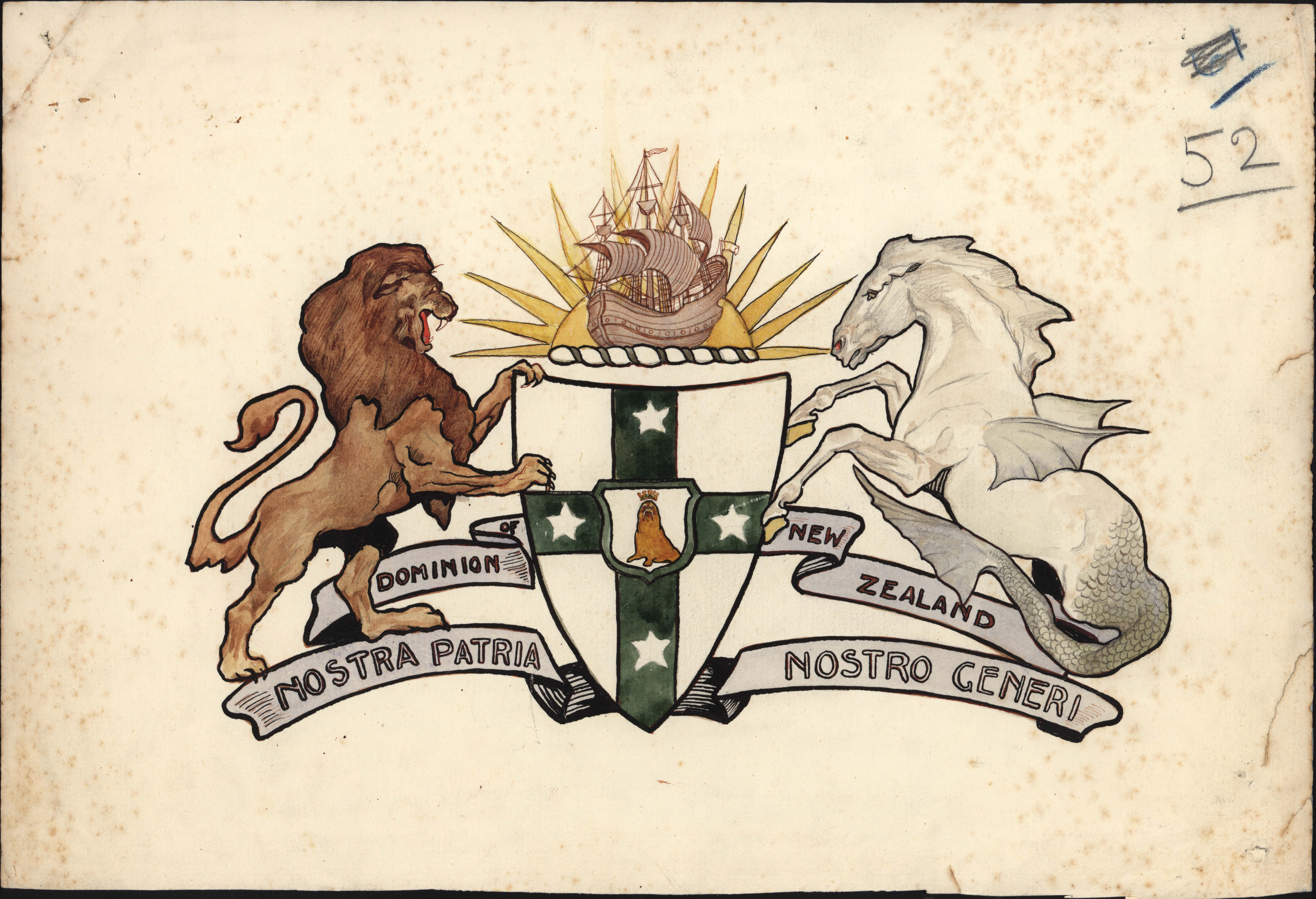
In 1908 a competition was held to design a coat of arms. This entry, 'Nostra Patria Nostro Generi', is by an unknown designer and was one of the final three selected. It features traditional heraldic imagery of a hippocamp, a lion rampant and a 'sea-lion guardian'.

With the evolution of New Zealand self-government, especially the granting of dominion status in 1907, it was decided that a new coat of arms was required. An official competition held in 1908 received 78 designs. The winning entry was a design by James McDonald, a draughtsman in the Department of Tourist and Health Resorts. Some minor adjustments were made to the design and the arms were granted by royal warrant of King George V on 26 August 1911. The warrant was published in the New Zealand Gazette of 11 January 1912.

The central shield has remained unaltered since 1911. It comprises a quartered shield containing in the first quarter four stars representing the Southern Cross constellation (as depicted on the national flag, but with the stars in different proportions); in the second quarter, a Golden Fleece; in the third, a wheat sheaf; and in the fourth, two hammers (see § Symbolism). Over all this is a pale—a broad vertical strip—with three ships representing the importance of maritime trade and "recalling the 19th-century settlement of the country by European migrants".

=== 1956 redesign ===
In the original design, the crest was a demi-lion (the upper half of a rampant lion) holding the Union Flag, and the scroll at the shield's base featured the then motto of the country, "Onward".

Although the royal warrant specified the design of the coat of arms, by the mid-1940s at least 20 variants were in use. One month prior to New Zealand's adoption of the Statute of Westminster (which formally accepted the full external autonomy offered by the British Parliament) on 25 September 1947, a special committee was formed by then Prime Minister Peter Fraser. Responsible for the "redrawing and standardisation of the Coat of Arms", the committee consisted of Alister McIntosh, Joe Heenan, Colin Aikman, Frank Corner, Foss Shanahan and Professor John Cawte Beaglehole. One of the committee's concerns was that the female supporter looked too much like a "Soviet heroine". Following the election of the First National Government in 1949, the new Attorney-General, Jack Marshall (later Prime Minister) took up responsibility for the committee. Marshall requested the woman to be re-drawn based on the likeness of Grace Kelly, a favourite actress of his.

Queen Elizabeth II approved a revised version in 1956; she also expressly authorised the use of the St Edward's Crown in the arms. That design is still in use today.

== Symbolism ==
New Zealand coat of arms explained

The coat of arms depicts a shield with four quadrants divided by a central pale:

- The first quadrant depicts the four stars on the national flag, representing the asterism within the constellation of Crux; the second quadrant depicts a golden fleece, representing the nation's farming industry; the third depicts a sheaf of wheat for agriculture; and the fourth quadrant depicts crossed hammers for mining.
- The pale depicts three ships, representing the importance of sea trade, and the immigrant nature of all New Zealanders.
- The dexter supporter is a European woman carrying the flag of New Zealand, while the sinister supporter is a Māori rangatira (chief) holding a taiaha (fighting weapon) and wearing a kaitaka (flax cloak).
  - The female figure is said to be a depiction of Zealandia, a common national personification of New Zealand during the first half of the 20th century. It also broadly represents all "non-indigenous citizens of the country".
- The shield is surmounted by a rendition of St Edward's Crown, which has been used in the coronations of New Zealand's monarchs. The Crown also represents New Zealand's historic ties to the United Kingdom.
- Below is a scroll with "New Zealand" on it, behind which (constituting the "heraldic compartment" on which the supporters stand) are two fern branches, representing the native vegetation.

== Status and uses ==
None of New Zealand's national symbols—including the flag, the anthems, and coat of arms—are mentioned in the Constitution Act 1986. The official use of the coat of arms was mandated by royal warrant in 1911. The use of state, royal, and viceregal emblems is also protected by the Flags, Emblems, and Names Protection Act 1981.

The arms are a symbol of national sovereignty. As such, official usage of the coat of arms is restricted to the New Zealand Government. The symbol is used as a mark of authority by various government agencies and representatives, including the prime minister and Cabinet, and most courts, including the Supreme Court. The coat of arms also feature on all Acts of Parliament; and on the cover of the New Zealand passport, alongside the silver fern, another popular symbol of New Zealand.

A banner of the arms, defaced with a royal symbol, was used from 1962 until 2022 as the Queen's Personal Flag for New Zealand in her role as monarch of New Zealand. The flag of the governor-general of New Zealand has, since 2008, featured the shield of the arms on a blue background.

On a few special occasions, such as royal visits or jubilee celebrations, individuals and private organisations can display the coat of arms temporarily. It can only be used or published with the permission of the Ministry for Culture and Heritage.

== See also ==
- Flag of New Zealand
- Seal of New Zealand, used to authorise official instruments of government
- Queen's Personal New Zealand Flag
- New Zealand heraldry
