= Olive (color) =

Dark yellowish green color

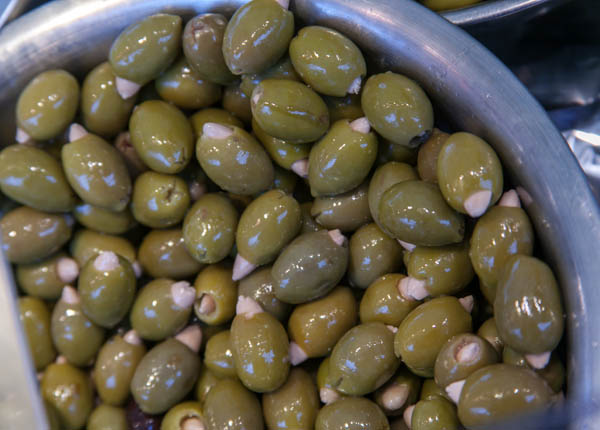
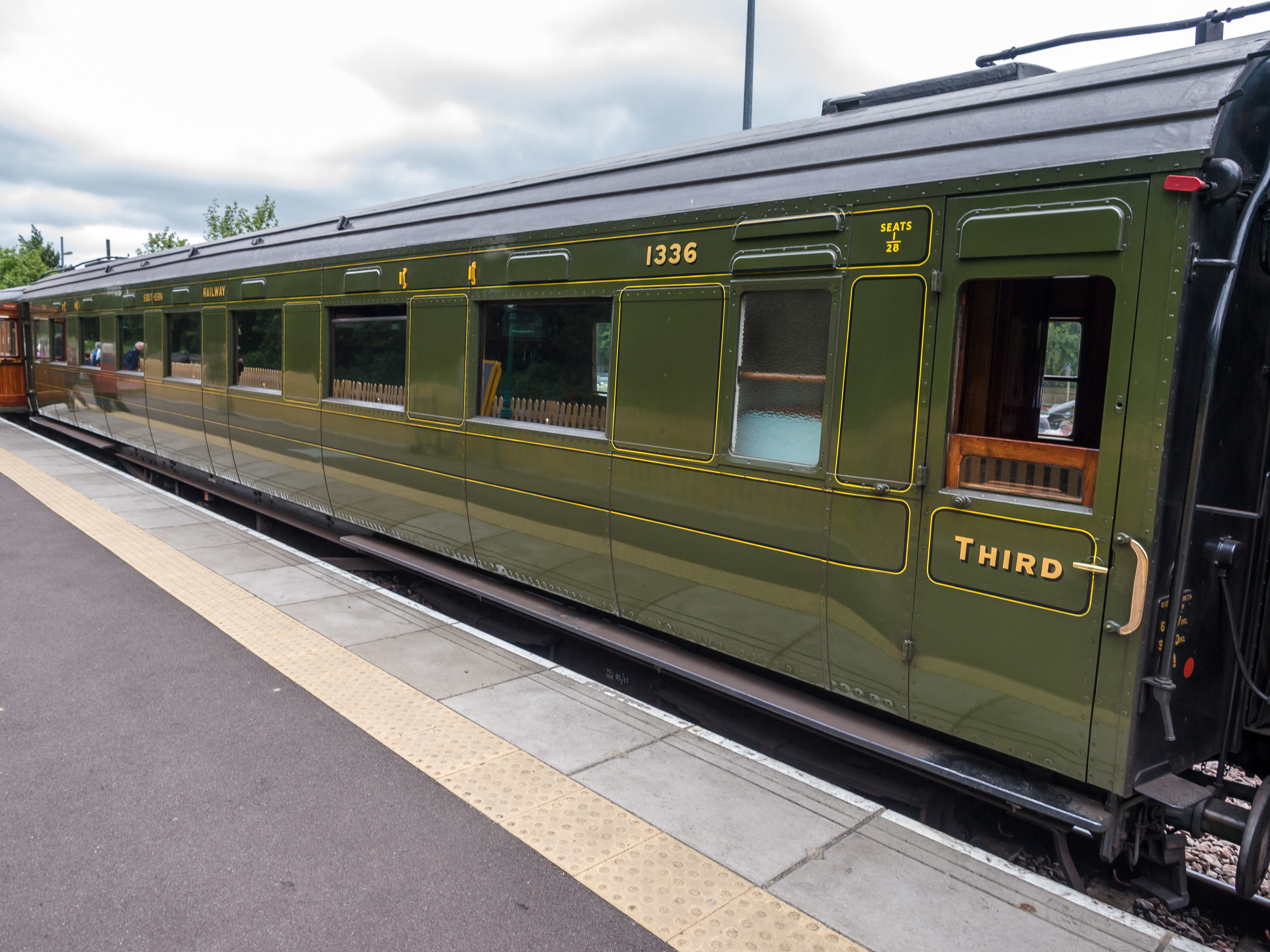
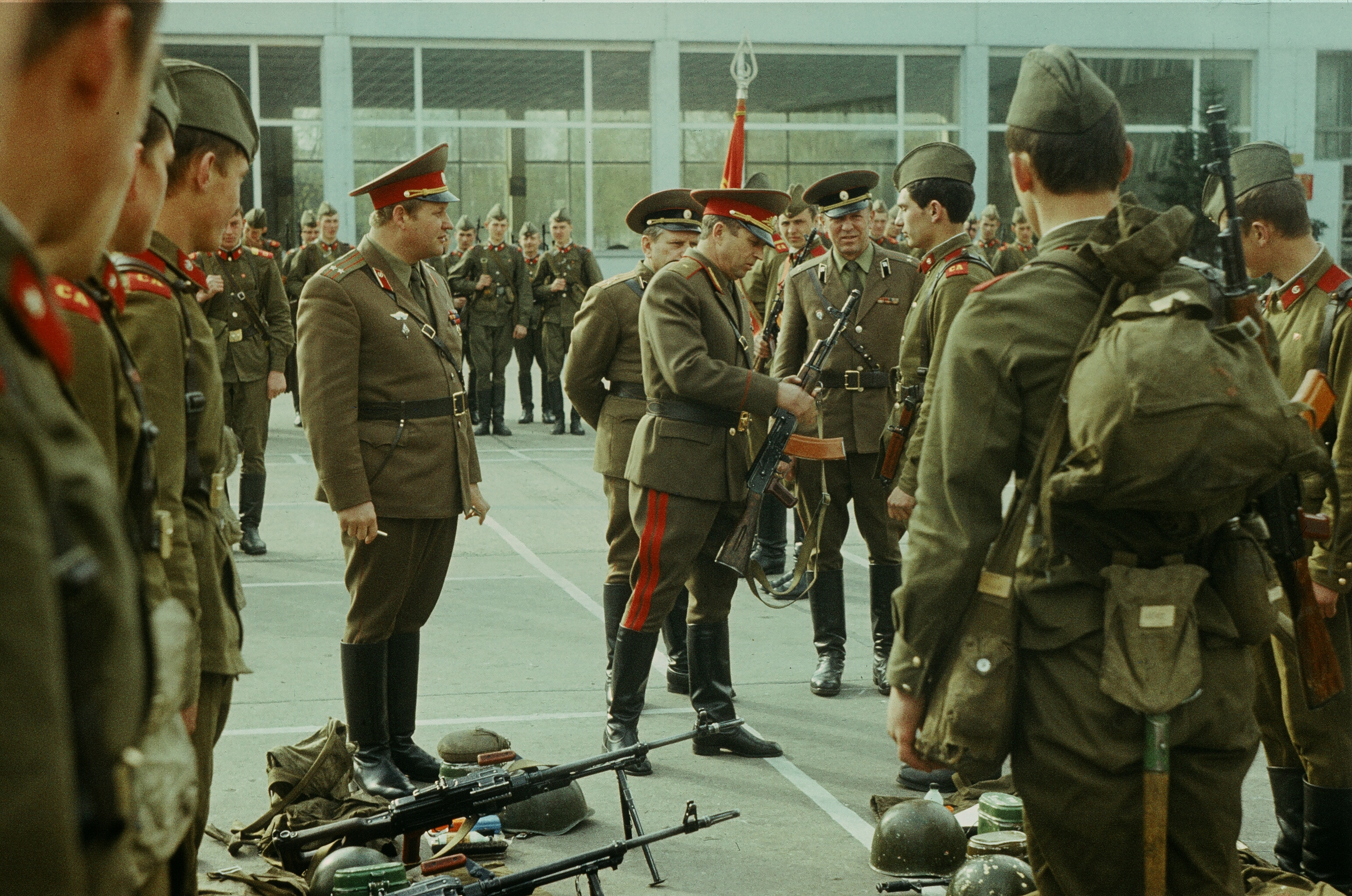
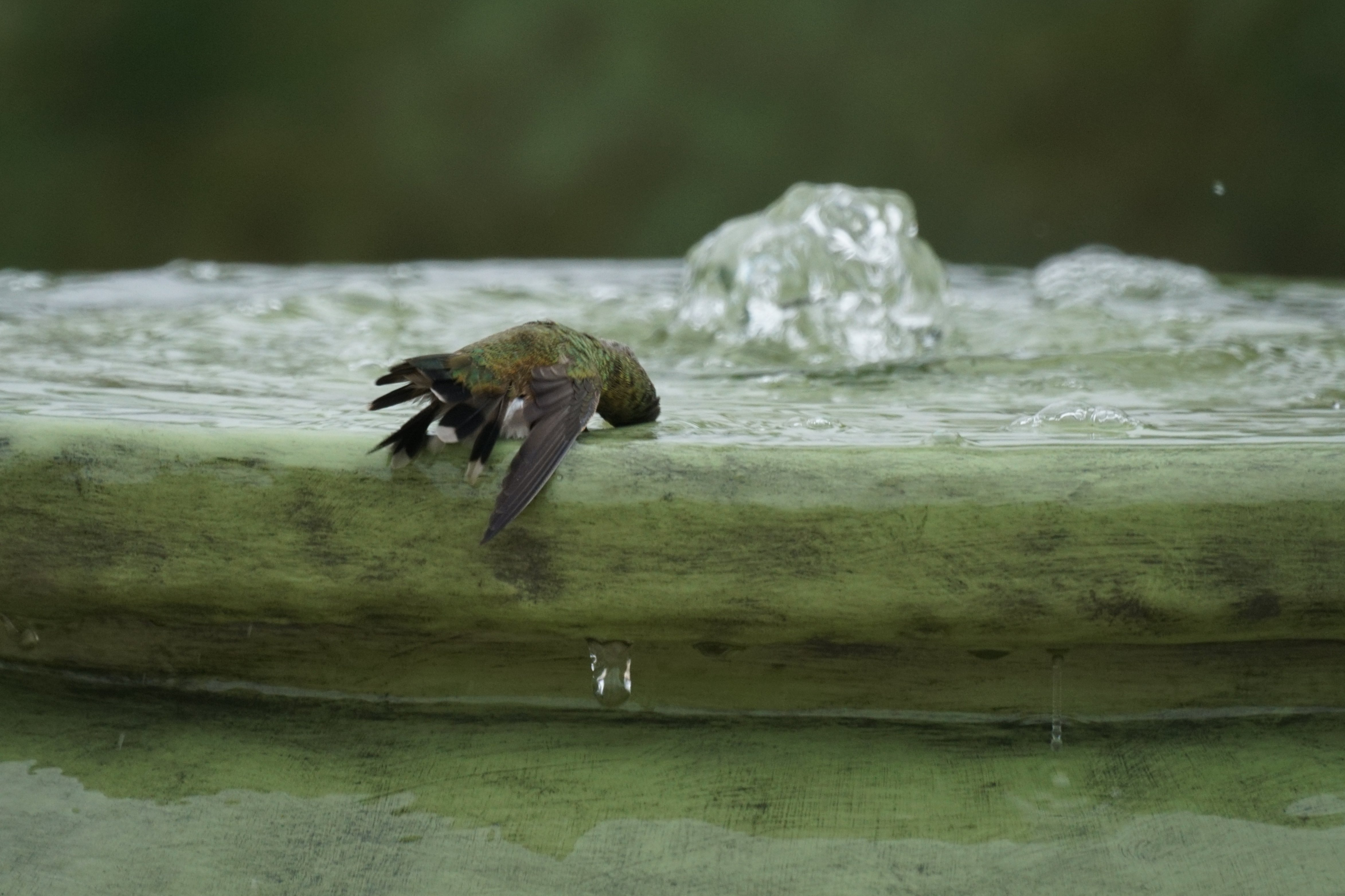
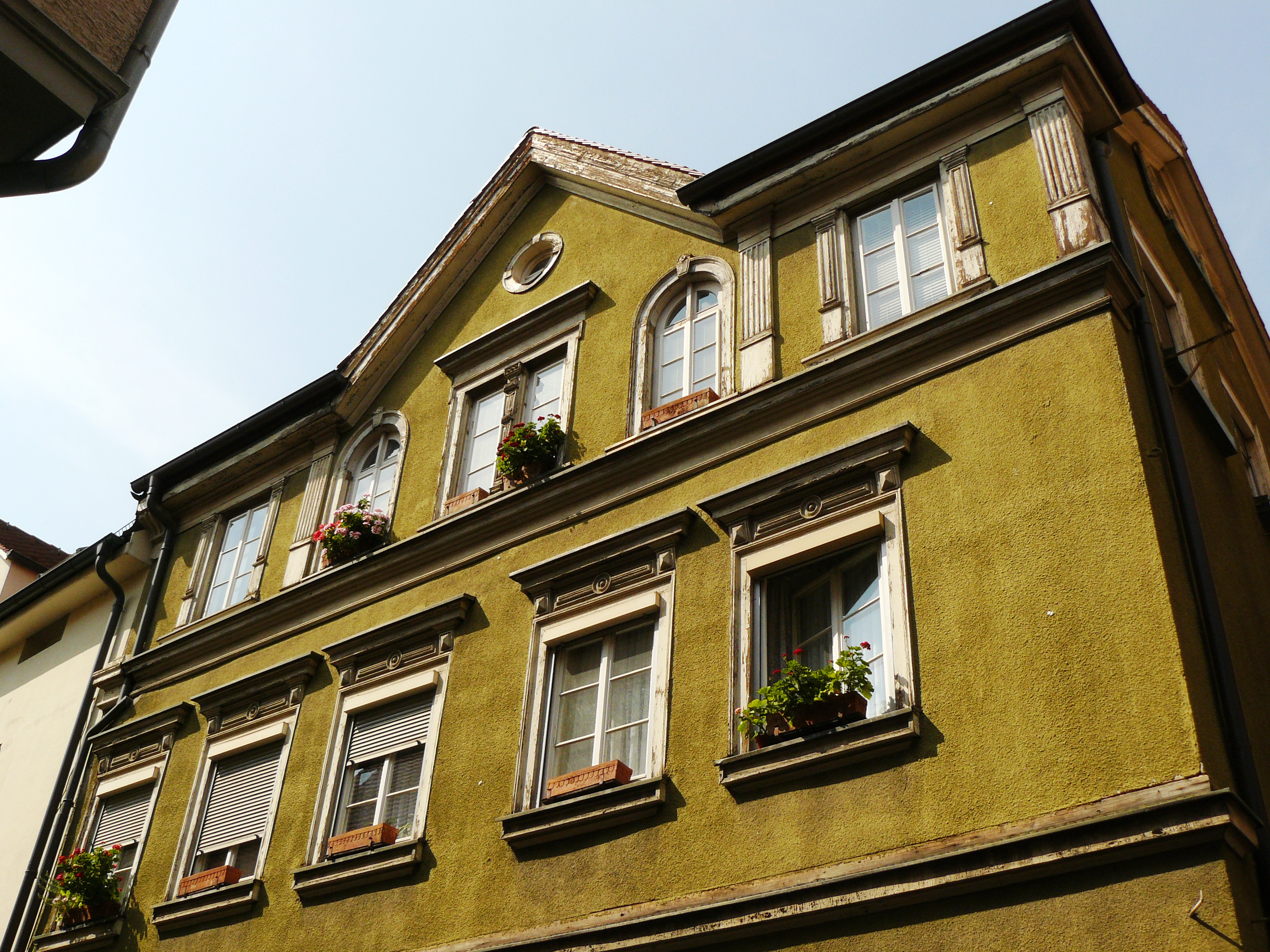
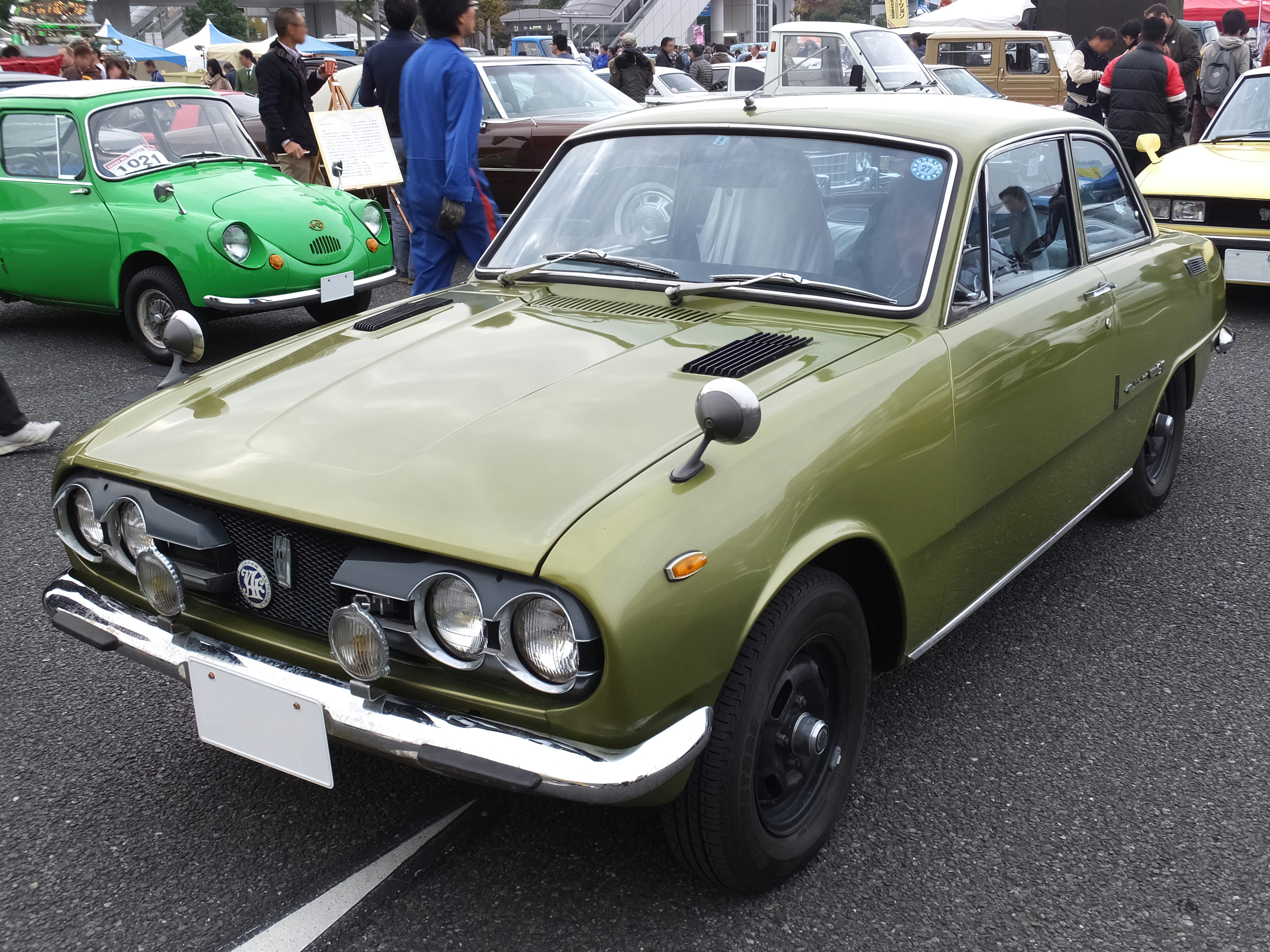
- Clockwise, from top left: Green olives stuffed with almonds; a Southern Railway Maunsell Coach, specifically a third class saloon coach; Hummingbird drinking from a fountain; Isuzu Bellett GT; facade of a house in Bad Cannstatt; The 20th Guards Combined Arms Army.

Color coordinates
- Hex triplet: #808000
- sRGB^{B} (r, g, b): (128, 128, 0)
- HSV (h, s, v): (60°, 100%, 50%)
- CIELCh_{uv} (L, C, h): (52, 57, 86°)
- Source: X11 color names
- ISCC–NBS descriptor: Light olive
- B: Normalized to [0–255] (byte); H: Normalized to [0–100] (hundred)

Olive, also called olive green, is a dark shade of yellowish green, like that of unripe or green olives.

As a color word in the English language, it appears in late Middle English.

== Variations ==
=== Olive drab ===
Olive drab

Color coordinates
- Hex triplet: #6B8E23
- sRGB^{B} (r, g, b): (107, 142, 35)
- HSV (h, s, v): (80°, 75%, 56%)
- CIELCh_{uv} (L, C, h): (55, 60, 107°)
- Source: X11 color names
- ISCC–NBS descriptor: Strong yellow green
- B: Normalized to [0–255] (byte)

Olive drab camouflage

Color coordinates
- Hex triplet: #544F3D
- sRGB^{B} (r, g, b): (84, 79, 61)
- HSV (h, s, v): (47°, 27%, 33%)
- CIELCh_{uv} (L, C, h): (34, 14, 73°)
- Source: Federal Standard 595 33070
- ISCC–NBS descriptor: Grayish olive
- B: Normalized to [0–255] (byte)

Olive drab is variously described as a "A brownish-green colour" (Oxford English Dictionary); "a shade of greenish-brown" (Webster's New World Dictionary); "a dark gray-green" (MacMillan English dictionary); "a grayish olive to dark olive brown or olive gray" (American Heritage Dictionary); or "A dull but fairly strong gray-green color" (Collins English Dictionary). It is widely used as a camouflage color for uniforms and equipment in the armed forces.

The first recorded use of olive drab as a color name in English was in 1892. Drab is an older color name, from the middle of the 16th century. It refers to a dull light brown color, the color of cloth made from undyed homespun wool. It took its name from the old French word for cloth, drap.

There are many shades and variations of olive drab. Various shades were used on United States Army uniforms in World War II. The shade used for enlisted soldier's uniforms at the beginning of the war was called Olive Drab #33 (OD33). Officer's uniforms used the much darker Olive Drab #51 (OD51). Field equipment was in Olive Drab #3 (OD3), a very light, almost khaki shade.

In 1943, new field uniforms and equipment were produced in the darker Olive Drab #7 (OD7). In 1952, this was replaced by the slightly grayer Olive Green 107 (OG-107), which continued as the color of combat uniforms through the Vietnam War until the adoption in 1981 of the four-color-camouflage-patterned M81 Battle Dress Uniform, which retained olive drab as one of the color swatches in the pattern. The shade used for painting vehicles is defined by Federal Standard 595 in the United States.

As a solid color, it is not as effective for camouflage as multi-color patterns, though it is still used by the U.S. military to color webbing and accessories. The armies of Israel, India, Cuba, and Venezuela wear solid-color olive drab uniforms.

In the American novel A Separate Peace, Finny says to Gene, "...and in these times of war, we all see olive drab, and we all know it is the patriotic color. All others aren't about the war; they aren't patriotic."

Pantone 448 C, "the ugliest color in the world" commonly used in plain tobacco packaging, was initially described as a shade of olive green.

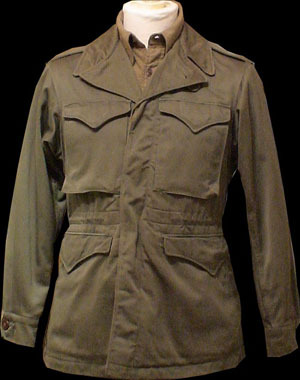
An olive drab M-1943 field jacket, worn by US soldiers during World War II and the Korean War.

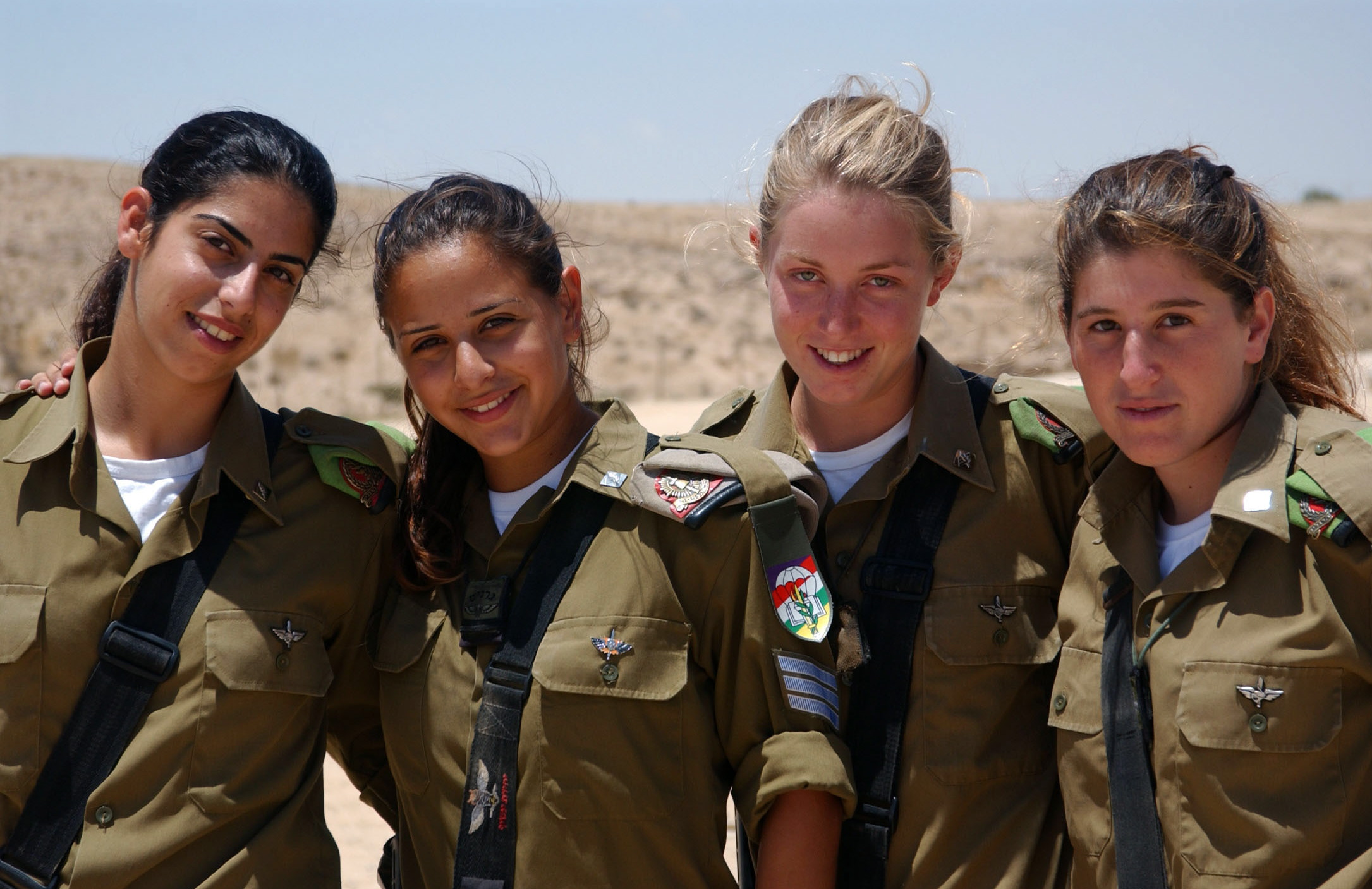
Olive drab is the uniform color of the Israel Army.

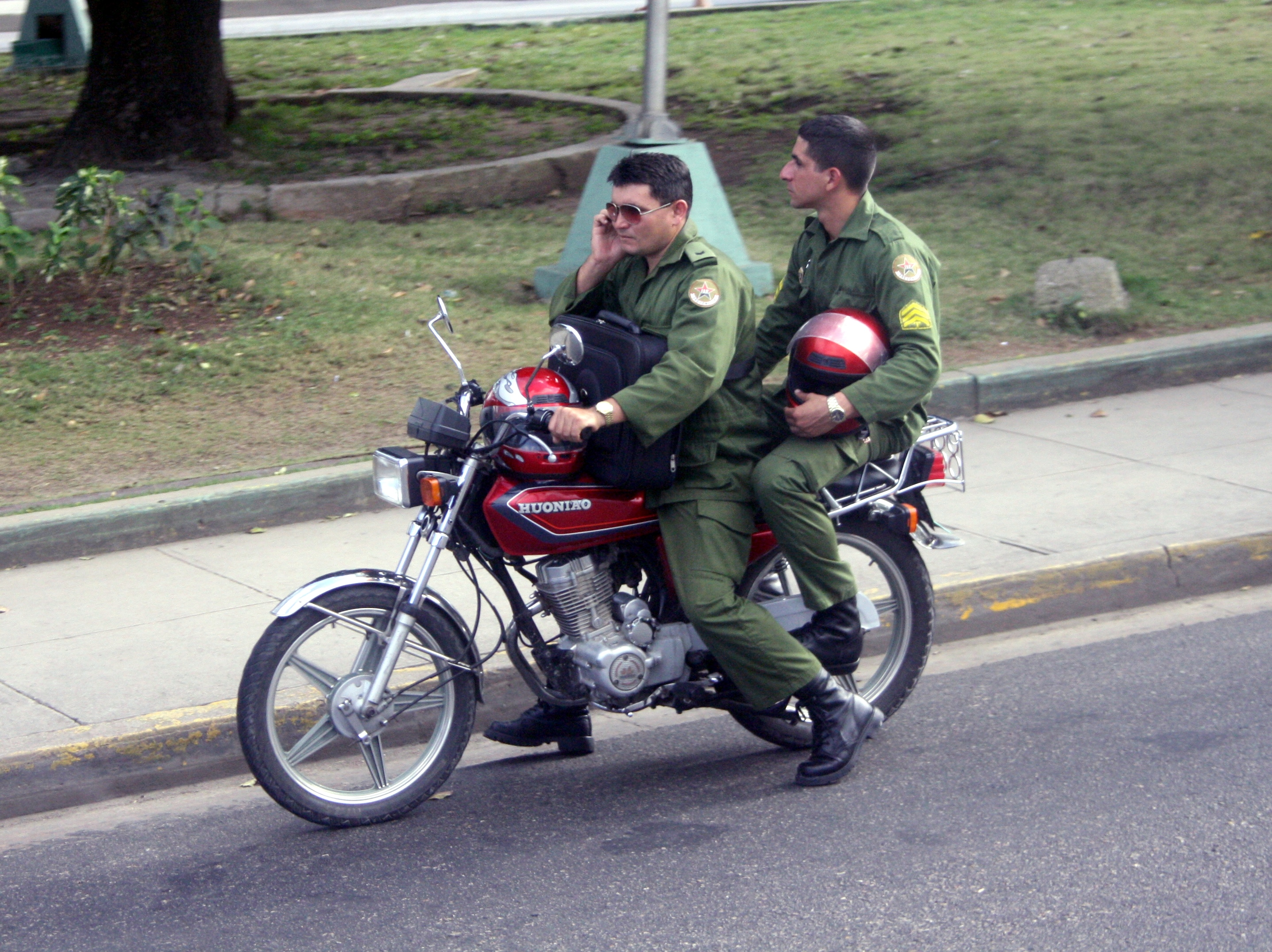
Cuban soldiers in olive drab.

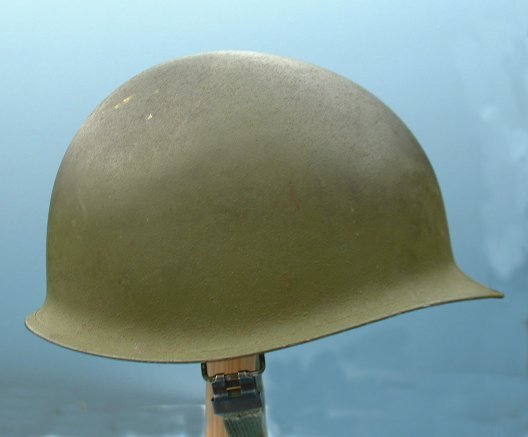
An M1 helmet, the standard helmet of the U.S. Army from 1941 through the Vietnam War. This helmet is from the Vietnam War; the color is olive green 107.

=== Olivine ===
Olivine

Color coordinates
- Hex triplet: #9AB973
- sRGB^{B} (r, g, b): (154, 185, 115)
- HSV (h, s, v): (87°, 38%, 73%)
- CIELCh_{uv} (L, C, h): (71, 48, 108°)
- Source: 99colors.net/Maerz & Paul
- ISCC–NBS descriptor: Moderate yellow green
- B: Normalized to [0–255] (byte)

Olivine is the typical color of the mineral olivine.

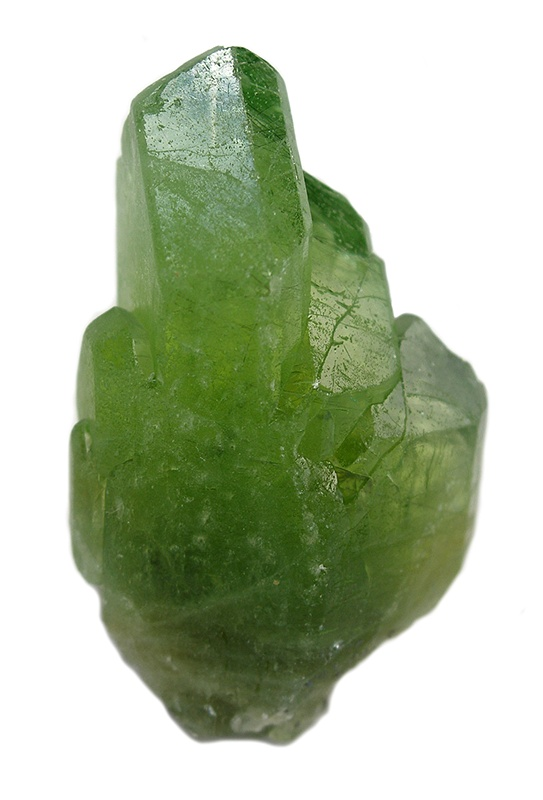
Olivine crystals

The first recorded use of olivine as a color name in English was in 1912.

=== Black olive ===
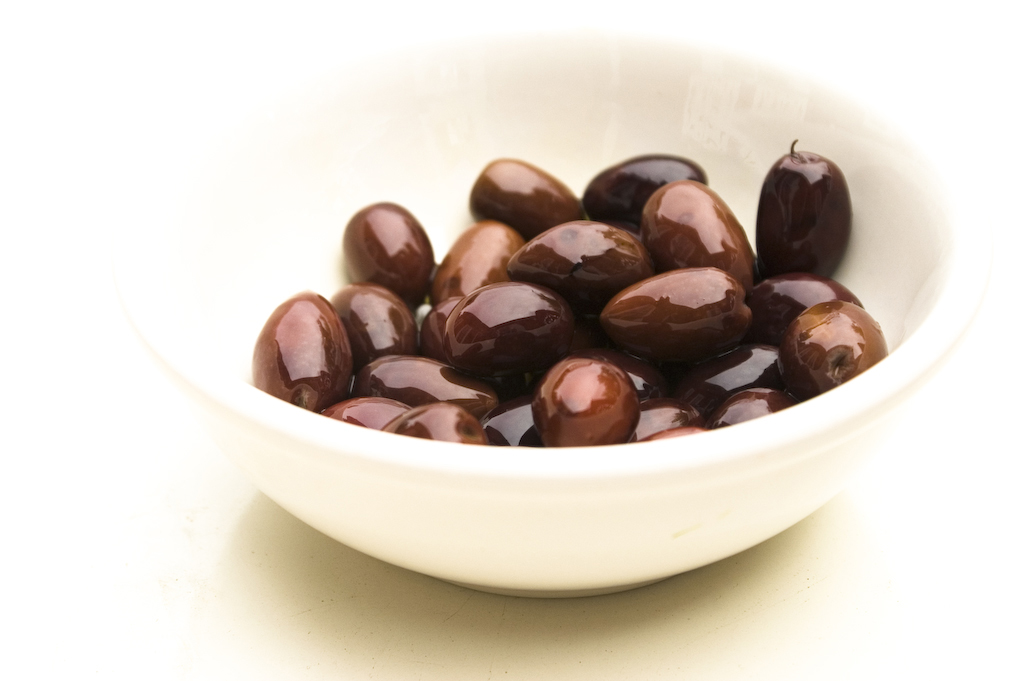
An example of black olives

Black olive

Color coordinates
- Hex triplet: #3B3C36
- sRGB^{B} (r, g, b): (59, 60, 54)
- HSV (h, s, v): (70°, 10%, 24%)
- CIELCh_{uv} (L, C, h): (25, 4, 93°)
- Source: RAL / ColorsData
- ISCC–NBS descriptor: Dark grayish olive green
- B: Normalized to [0–255] (byte)

Black olive is a color in the RAL color matching system. It is designated as RAL 6015.

The color "black olive" is a representation of the color of black olives.

== Olive in culture ==
Ethnography

- The term "olive-skinned" is sometimes used to denote shades of medium-toned skin that is darker than the average color for White people, especially in connection with a Mediterranean ethnicity.

== See also ==
- List of colors
- Khaki, another color common in military uniforms
- Sage, a color visually similar to olive green
