= Royal Air Force roundels =

UK defence force identification marks

RAF roundel

The air forces of the United Kingdom – the Royal Navy's Fleet Air Arm, the Army's Army Air Corps and the Royal Air Force use a roundel, a circular identification mark, painted on aircraft to identify them to other aircraft and ground forces. In one form or another, it has been used on British military aircraft from 1915 to the present.

== Background ==
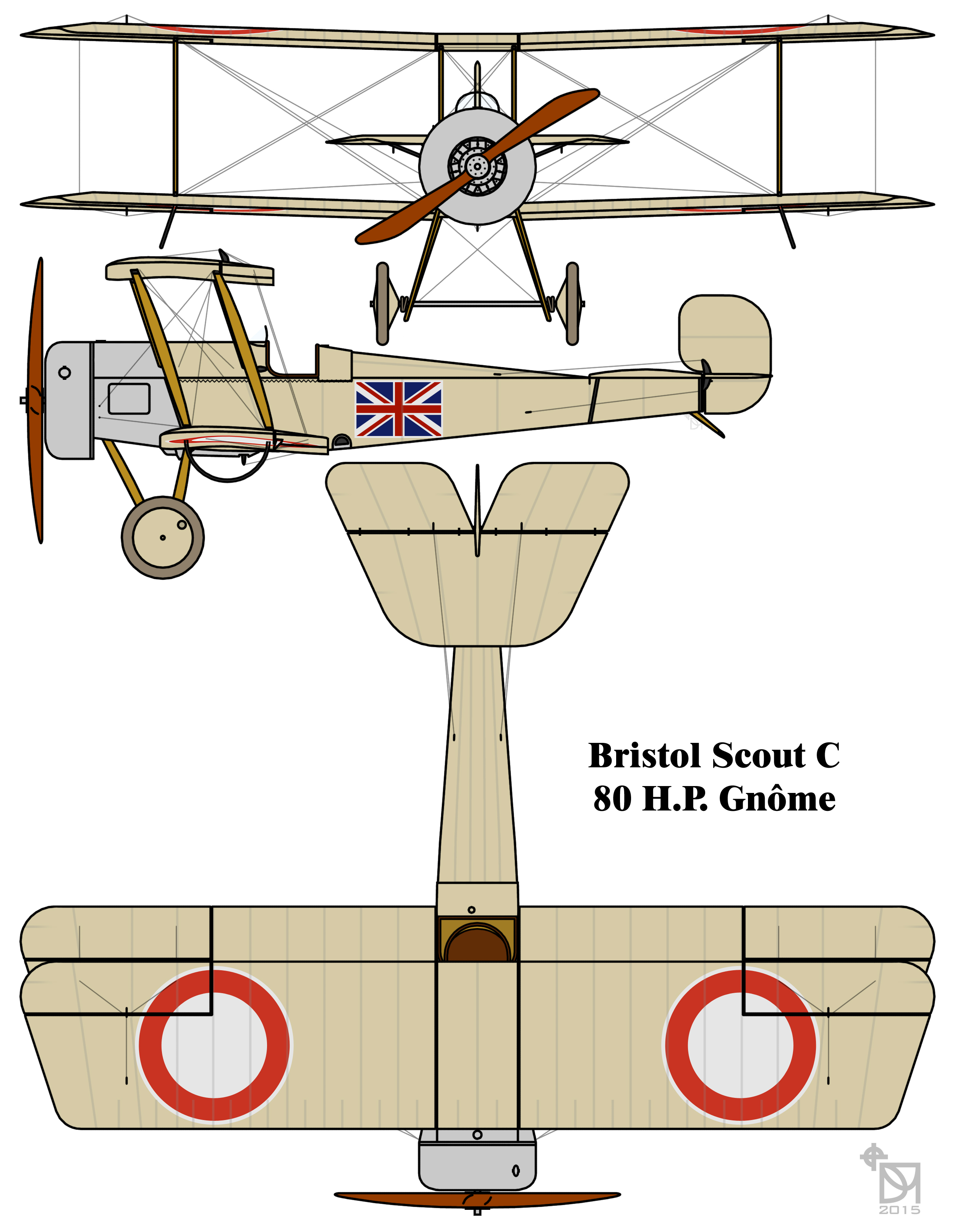
RNAS Bristol Scout C, with 1914/15-style red-ring style wing roundels

When the First World War started in 1914, it was the habit of ground troops to fire on all aircraft, friend or foe, so that the need for some form of identification mark became evident. At first the Union Flag was painted under the wings and on the sides of the fuselage. It soon became obvious that at a distance the St George's Cross of the Union Flag was likely to be confused with the Iron Cross that was already being used to identify German aircraft. After the use of a Union Flag inside a shield was tried it was decided to follow the lead of the French who used a tricolour cockade (a roundel of red and white with a blue centre). The British reversed the colours and it became the standard marking on Royal Flying Corps aircraft from 11 December 1914, although it was well into 1915 before the new marking was used with complete consistency. The official order stated:

All aeroplanes of the RFC to be marked on the underside and on the rudder with concentric circles similar to those on the French machines but with the colours reversed, that is with a red circle inside a blue ring. The circles to be as large as possible. In addition a Union Jack 2 ft (0.61 m) x 1 ft 6 in (0.46 m) will be painted on the wing tips outside the circles.

The Royal Naval Air Service specified in A.I.D. SK. No. A78 a five-foot red ring with a white centre and a thin white outline on the lower surfaces of the lower wings at mid span, from October 1914 until it was decided to standardise on the RFC roundel for all British military aircraft in June 1915. With the same roundel being carried by RFC and RNAS aircraft, the use of the Union Jack was discontinued. The Royal Flying Corps and its successor the Royal Air Force have employed numerous versions of the roundel since then.

By 1917, a thin white outline was usually added to the roundel, to make the blue of the outer circle easier to distinguish from the dark PC.10 and PC.12 protective dope. On squadrons operating at night there was not the same need to make the marking more conspicuous, indeed it became customary to overpaint the white ring of the roundel itself, either in the camouflage finish of the aircraft as a whole, or in red. By the end of the war this had become standardised as the so-called "night roundel" of blue and red, which continued to be used on the dark NIVO green camouflage of post-war night bombers. Most RAF aircraft now had a silver finish (either bare metal or aluminium dope) so that the national markings were conspicuous enough without outlining. During the late 1930s RAF and Fleet Air Arm (FAA) aircraft were once again camouflaged, and a new outline was introduced, this time trainer yellow, and the same width as the blue and white rings.

== Use by other air arms ==
Aside from the RAF, the Royal Navy's Royal Naval Air Service (First World War) and later the Fleet Air Arm as well as the air elements of the British Army all adopted the same roundels.

Many nations which had been within the British Empire and Commonwealth continued to use British roundels despite having achieved independence, including Canada, Australia, New Zealand, and India until nationalism demanded unique roundels for each of those countries.

South Africa experimented with the four flag colours briefly, but then reverted to the RAF roundel but replaced the red with orange, and then the dot with a Springbok before replacing the disk with a five pointed castle.

In Canada, the Royal Canadian Air Force changed the red dot into a silver maple leaf, while the Royal Canadian Navy adopted the sugar maple leaf and both were replaced with a geometric stylized leaf.

Australia changed the red dot to a kangaroo (both standing and running were proposed before the running variant won out) and New Zealand experimented with gold, green and white ferns inset in the red dot before settling on a red kiwi.

India briefly replaced the SEAC roundel (blue on blue) with a blue and white Ashoka Chakra, before adopting an orange, white and green roundel on similar lines.

Southern Rhodesia, the Federation of Rhodesia and Nyasaland and Rhodesia used variations on the British roundel featuring assegais before adopting a green ring with a lion and tusk on a white centre in 1970.

== Roundel history ==
The use of letters (A, B, C, D) to denote different versions of roundels does not come from official documents, but rather from attempts by historians in the 1950s to catalogue the various roundels being used. Official documents instead provided dimensions in inches. Since most sources now use this nomenclature it has been included here.

Ratio; 1:3:5	Type A	On all light-coloured surfaces 1915 to late 1929, and on dark surfaces with a 2-inch white border (similar to later type A2) on camouflaged surfaces 1915–1919. Colours used were to VB and VR specifications (with a number from 1 to 5 defining exactly which spec), colours did not change much; however, early versions were prone to fading. Prior to the introduction of the Type B night roundel, aircraft used on night operations had the white overpainted with the prevailing camouflage colour, usually PC.10 or black. Due to the effect of orthochromatic film – the most widely available film during World War I and onwards through the early World War II years – rendering the blue very pale and the red very dark in photographs, historians in the 1950s and 1960s incorrectly believed a white ring roundel had been used on home defence aircraft.
Ratio; 1:3:5	Type A	Used after late 1929 when colours were increased in saturation until replaced by Type B during summer 1938. Official names of colours changed to "identification red" and "identification blue". As on the earlier Type A roundel, a white border was sometimes used, mainly on flying boats and some prototypes from 1923 to 1937 even when the aircraft was doped silver.
Ratio; 1:3:5	Type A	Duller colours (referred to as "identification red (dull)" and "identification blue (dull)" in official orders), used with Type A.1 during WWII but on light surfaces, primarily under the wings of fighters until replaced by Type C in June 1942
Ratio; 1:3:5:7	Type A.1	On all camouflaged surfaces 1937 – March 1939 (e.g.: Supermarine Spitfire); on fuselage sides 1939 to replacement by type C.1, July 1942. On some night bombers the white was overpainted with black to reduce visibility. Also used with bright pre-war colours, especially on trainers. The chrome yellow outermost ring on this roundel variation was usually picked up by orthochromatic film in photos as a shade of dark grey, nearly as dark as the central red circle would be. Also used as ground vehicle markings in the UK, Middle East, North Africa and Italy from January 1942 to mid-1943 as air recognition signs.
Ratio approx. 1:3:5:6	Type A.2	Outer yellow ring is thicker than used during WWI. Alternative to A.1 on some aircraft 1940 – 1942, including the Grumman Martlet as received from the factory, indicating that it was likely official despite the lack of orders describing it. Also used as ground vehicle markings in the UK, Middle East, North Africa and Italy from January 1942 to mid-1943 as air recognition signs.
Ratio; 2:5	Type B	On some night flying aircraft, especially heavy bombers, 1918 – 1919. (Known at this time as the "night roundel"). On all surfaces of NIVO-coloured night bombers from 1923 until NIVO phased out; Used on camouflaged aircraft in all positions from Summer 1938 until superseded by Type A.1 roundels. Used on upper surfaces of many aircraft until 1947. On fuselage sides and upper wings of overall PRU blue photo-reconnaissance aircraft 1940 – 1944 (e.g.: photo-reconnaissance Spitfires) and aircraft with "high altitude" camouflage (e.g.: de Havilland Hornet) 1944 – 1947.
Ratio; 2:5:8	Type B.1	On some aircraft March – December 1939. Used on fuselage sides of some night-flying aircraft (bombers, e.g. Vickers Wellington; night fighters, e.g., Boulton Paul Defiant) late 1940 – mid-1942. Often type B with additional yellow ring (proportions do not match Type A).
Ratio; 3:4:8	Type C	On light surfaces July 1942 – 1947; not used on upper surfaces 1942–1945.
Ratio; 3:4:8:9	Type C.1	On dark surfaces except upper surfaces July 1942 – January 1945; upper wings and fuselage sides of all Second Tactical Air Force (2 TAF) bombers and photo-reconnaissance Spitfires, January 1945 to early 1947. Upper and lower wings and fuselage sides of 2 TAF fighters (e.g.: Hawker Tempest) January 1945 to early 1947.
Ratio; 4:8:9	(SEAC)	Used by units under South East Asia Command and in the China Burma India (CBI) theatre in 1942. Red removed to avoid confusion with the Japanese hinomaru, but retained on fin flash. Not used for very long before being replaced by light blue and dark blue roundel. A blue/white roundel, sometimes with US-style white bars, was also used on Fleet Air Arm aircraft Blue/white roundels were also used by the Royal Australian Air Force (RAAF), which simply over-painted the red dot in white, regardless of previous proportions.
Ratio; 2:5	(SEAC)	Used by units under South East Asia Command and in the CBI theatre mid-1942 – 1946. Red removed to avoid confusion with Japanese hinomaru. Initially red was overpainted with white but this compromised the camouflage and the normal roundel blue was mixed 50:50 with white. Many aircraft in the CBI theatre used roundels and fin flashes of approximately half the normal dimensions.
Ratio; 1:2:3	Type D	On all surfaces from June 1947 to this day, with similar proportions to the current roundel of the French Armee de l'Air. Colours reverted to Bright Identification colours but were matched to a new British Standard colour chart so colours were different from prewar bright colours. Note the different proportions from the Type A. The Type D was first used on ground equipment, including jeeps, and with a yellow outline on rescue launches.
Ratio; 1:2:3	Type D pale	A pale 'faded' version of the Type D. This was sometimes used when applied over anti-flash white. An intermediate (less faded) pale version was applied to some Vickers Valiants prior to the introduction of the definitive Type D 'faded' shading.
Ratio; 1:2	Low-visibility	Low-visibility roundel used on camouflaged aircraft since the 1970s (different proportions from Type B).
Ratio; 1:2	Low-visibility	Low-visibility roundel used in conjunction with air superiority grey schemes since the 1980s. Colours are known as "salmon pink" and "baby blue".
Ratio; 1:2	Low-visibility	Low-visibility roundel used on the Lockheed Martin F-35 Lightning II, with the centre being the same grey as the airframe. Unlike previous roundels, they are created in the manufacturing process of the airframe rather than painted on.

== Roundel sizes ==
=== Pre-war ===
Up until mid-1938, roundel sizes tended to vary widely, depending on the type of aircraft; the exception to the use of type A roundels for all aircraft was seen on the overall NIVO (a dark grey-green finish with a sheen) painted night bombers (e.g., Handley Page Heyfords) which used type B roundels. Roundels used on aircraft painted in NIVO were duller than the normal colours. The size of the roundel was generally determined by the space available at the specified location, with a space of several inches around the edges. Some aircraft – primarily seaplanes, had a white outline around the fuselage roundel, even on silver doped finishes however this application was inconsistent so was probably not official. From 1929, the RAF switched to a new system of colour specifications, discarding the one used since the First World War, and as a result, the colour used for insignia changed, however the changeover period appears to have extended until at least 1932 for new production, and the old colours were not overpainted, but only gradually phased out as aircraft needed to be repainted.

During the Munich crisis of mid- to late 1938, most RAF aircraft adopted green and dark earth camouflage with type B roundels of reduced sizes on all upper surfaces and the fuselage sides; though based on colour photos, these remained in the bright pre-war colours. FAA aircraft largely remained silver doped overall with type A roundels predominating. To illustrate the progression up to the end of the war the Spitfire will be used as a typical single seat-single engine fighter:

1938 – November 1939: The first production batches of Spitfires (aircraft registrations K9787-K9814) were built with 37.8 inches (96 cm) roundels on the fuselage sides-these were centred 39 in (990 mm) aft of the rear edge of the cockpit door. 56 inches (140 cm) type A1s were on the upper wings. From K9815, the fuselage roundels were moved back, to be centred 53 inches (130 cm) aft of the cockpit door and 6 inches (15 cm) above the main longeron, and reduced in diameter to 35 inches (89 cm) type A1. This position for the fuselage roundel was subsequently standard on all Supermarine and Westland built Spitfires and Seafires. The first 180 or so built (K9787–K9960) also had factory applied 50 inches (130 cm) type A roundels under the wings. After K9960, there were no factory applied under-wing roundels until December 1940. With the change to type B roundels Spitfires built with type A.1 roundels had were repainted by the squadrons creating a plethora of sizes and proportions.

Between K9961 and N3032, the factory paint scheme required 15 inches (38 cm) type B roundels on the fuselage sides and a 31.2 inches (79 cm) roundel with a 10 inches (25 cm) red centre on the upper wings. From N3033–P9374, it was intended that 25 inches (64 cm) type B fuselage roundels would be used, although few Spitfires saw service with roundels of this size.

Most RAF aircraft went through similar transitions, as a result of which there was little conformity, depending on when the aircraft was built and how squadrons over painted or repainted the roundels.

=== Second World War ===
By the beginning of the Second World War on 3 September 1939, RAF roundel sizes started to show more conformity. On 30 October, all commands were ordered to change upper wing surface Type B roundels to Type A. Further instructions ordered all but fighters and night bombers to have Type A under the wing tips. This was clarified in November to the effect that only reconnaissance maritime aircraft (e.g., Short Sunderland flying boats) would have the Type A on the upper wings but all aircraft would use the Type B on the sides.

A decision was made to make roundels more conspicuous and, in May 1940, the yellow outer ring was ordered to be added back to fuselage sides (along with red, white, and blue stripes on the fin). Where possible, the yellow should be the same width as the blue, but on Spitfires with their narrower fuselages a thinner ring was acceptable. Also in May, an order was made to put red, white, and blue roundels on the underwings of all fighters, with an addendum that where the roundel was on a black background it should be outlined in yellow. In June, orders were given for the half black/half-white underwing scheme to be replaced by "sky" Underwing roundels were dispensed with until August when they were ordered back.

Because of the pressures of front-line service there were always exceptions to the standards set by the RAF and that deadlines were not necessarily met. Although type C and C.1 roundels were meant to be in use by July 1942 some Spitfires displayed type A and A1 roundels as late as October:

- Late November/early December 1939 to June 1940: All Spitfire units were instructed to replace the type B fuselage roundels with type A roundels. This led to fuselage roundels which varied in size from 25 inches (64 cm) to 30 inches (76 cm). Upper wings had been set at 55 inches (140 cm) Type B with 22 inches (56 cm) red centres until January 1945; Fuselage sides: 35 inches (89 cm) type A; no fin flash; no underwing roundels.
- June 1940 to December 1940: Spitfires with the 35 inches (89 cm) type A fuselage roundels had a yellow outer ring added, making them 49 inches (120 cm) Type A1. All Spitfires built from June had standardised 35 inches (89 cm) fuselage roundels, although many had non-standard 7 inches (18 cm) red centres applied at the Supermarine factory, instead of the specified 5 inches (13 cm). All Castle Bromwich built Spitfires had roundels with the correct 5 in (130 mm) centre spot; in addition all Castle Bromwich built Spitfires had the roundels centred 52.25 inches (132.7 cm) aft of the cockpit door and 7.5 inches (19 cm) above the main longeron. As many Spitfires as possible had type A roundels painted under the wings, along with a pale green/blue camouflage colour. The under wing roundels varied widely in size and location depending on which Maintenance Unit (MU) prepared the aircraft before delivery to the squadrons. The Spitfire 1a of 19 Squadron shown in photo 5 has 25 inches (64 cm) Type A under the wingtips, indicating it may have been processed by 6 MU. Fin flashes were painted on starting in late May 1940. These varied in size although they were mostly 21 inches (53 cm) wide, divided in three red, white, and blue strips, and covered the full height of the tail fin.
- December 1940 to July 1942: 35 inches (89 cm) type A1 fuselage roundels, 50 inches (130 cm) type A on lower wings. Fin flash standardised at 27 inches (69 cm) high and 24 inches (61 cm) wide, equally divided into three 8 inches (20 cm) stripes.
- July 1942 to January 1945: 36 inches (91 cm) type C1 fuselage roundels. 32 inches (81 cm) type C lower wing roundels. Fin flash 24 inches (61 cm) square with stripe widths of 11 inches (28 cm), 2 inches (5.1 cm) and 11 inches (28 cm).
- January 1945 to June 1947: On all 2 TAF aircraft Type B upper wing roundels were either converted to 55 inches (140 cm) type C1 roundels or over-painted and 36 inches (91 cm) type C1 roundels painted on. Under wing roundels were converted to 36 inches (91 cm) type C1. The proportions of the rings and centre spot could vary depending on the skill of the painters carrying out the conversion.

Although the Spitfire is used as one example, because it was one of the few British aircraft to see front-line service before, during and after the Second World War, other aircraft types went through similar transitions. During the transition from A type to C type roundels some Hawker Typhoons displayed 42 inches (110 cm) type C1 roundels which were modified from type A1s. After June 1940 the official sizes for roundels were:

Type A	From June 1940: Single and twin engine fighters, light and medium bombers, dimensions could vary but generally 50 in (1,300 mm) for lower wings.
Type A.1	From June 1940: Single and twin engine fighters, light and medium bombers 35 in (890 mm). Exceptions: Hawker Typhoon 42 in (1,100 mm), Westland Whirlwind 28 in (710 mm). Heavy bombers, transport aircraft 49 in (1,200 mm).
Type C	From July 1942: Single and twin engine fighters, 32 in (810 mm). Not used on Night Bombers or de Havilland Mosquitoes.
Type C.1	From July 1942: Single and twin engine fighters, light and medium bombers, General Aircraft Hotspur and Hamilcar gliders, 36 in (910 mm). Some night intruder Hurricanes and Spitfires had 18 inches (46 cm) type C1 fuselage roundels in 1942. Heavy bombers, transport aircraft 54 in (1,400 mm).

Many variations could be seen because of the problems involved in interpreting instructions or repainting aircraft in front-line service, but most production aircraft conformed to these basic dimensions.

==== SEAC and RAAF ====
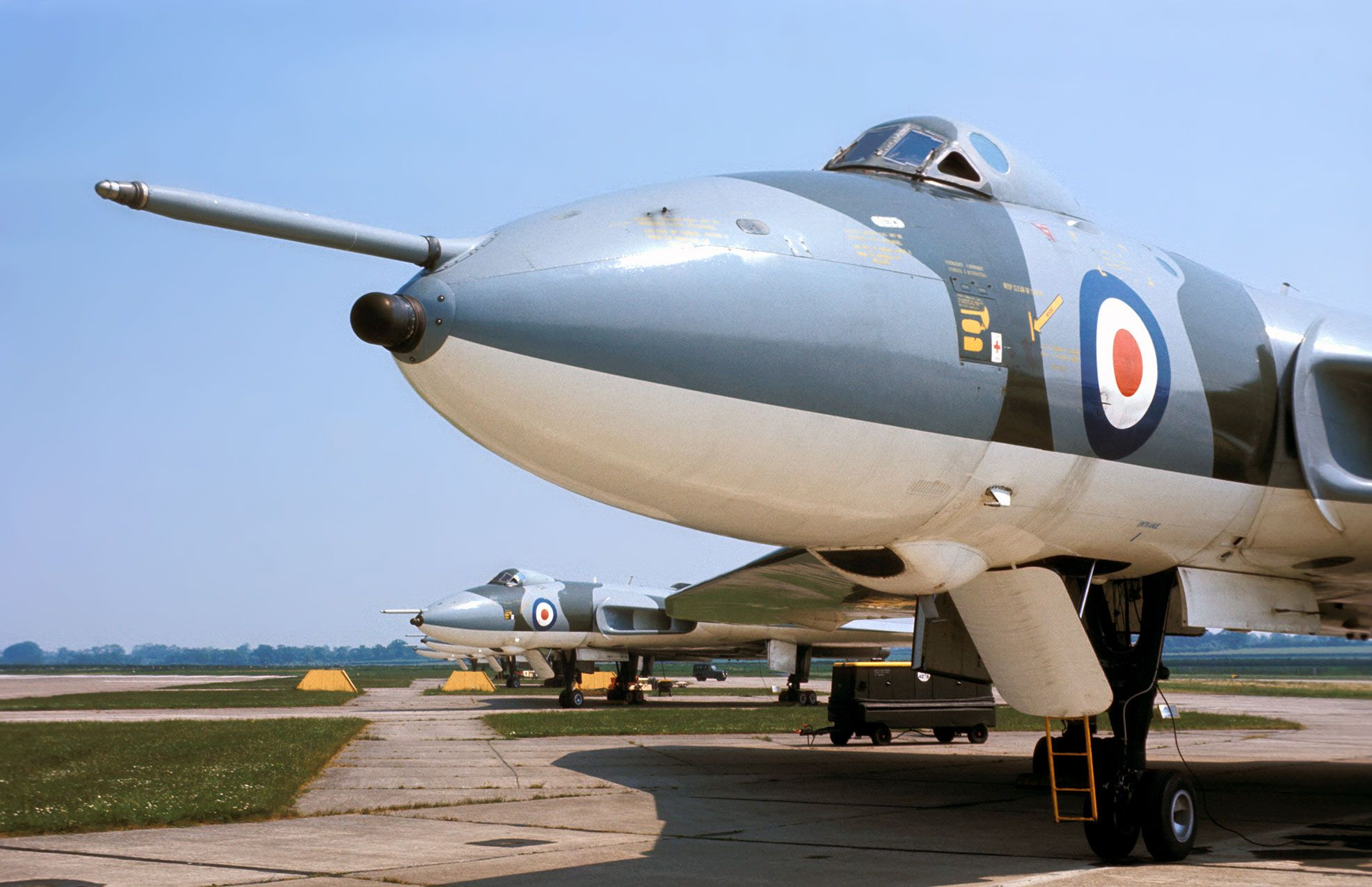
Type D roundels on Avro Vulcans of No 617 Squadron at RAF Cottesmore, c. 1975.

In the China/Burma/India (CBI) theatre and Pacific it was thought that the red centres of RAF roundels could be confused with the red hinomaru carried by Japanese aircraft. After an RAAF No. 11 Squadron Catalina was mistaken for a Japanese aircraft by a US Navy Wildcat in the Pacific Theatre and attacked, the roundels on RAAF were modified, mostly in the field, by painting over the red with white. Often the yellow outer rings of type A1 roundels were left intact. No British or American built aircraft had factory painted SEAC style roundels; all aircraft had to be repainted, and, in many cases re-camouflaged by Maintenance Units behind the lines or by front line squadrons.

When Spitfire Mk VCs reached the CBI Theatre in November 1943 their type B, C and C1 roundels were all modified by painting out the red centre spots in white, the red of the fin flash was similarly painted over. When the Mk VIIIs arrived in early 1944 most of them had their roundels overpainted completely and replaced by 16 inches (41 cm) diameter SEAC roundels with light blue centre spots (a mix of dull roundel blue and white) of approximately 7 inches (18 cm) diameter. The fin flashes were replaced by 24 inches (61 cm) high by 16 inches (41 cm) wide versions, each light blue (leading edge) and roundel blue stripe being 8 inches (20 cm) wide.

Mk VC Spitfires used by the Royal Australian Air Force over Northern Australia in October 1943 had their 36-inch type C1 fuselage roundels modified to 32 inches (81 cm) SEAC roundels by painting out the yellow outer ring in the camouflage colours and over-painting the red centre in white. The lower wing type C roundels and upper wing type Bs were also modified by over-painting the red centres in white. The red fin stripe was also painted out with white and, in many cases the blue was extended forward 1 in (25 mm) making equal widths of 12 inches (30 cm). RAAF Mk VIIIs had their roundels and fin flashes modified in the same ways, although some had their 55 inches (140 cm) upper wing roundels overpainted and replaced with 32 inches (81 cm) SEAC roundels.

== Fin flash ==

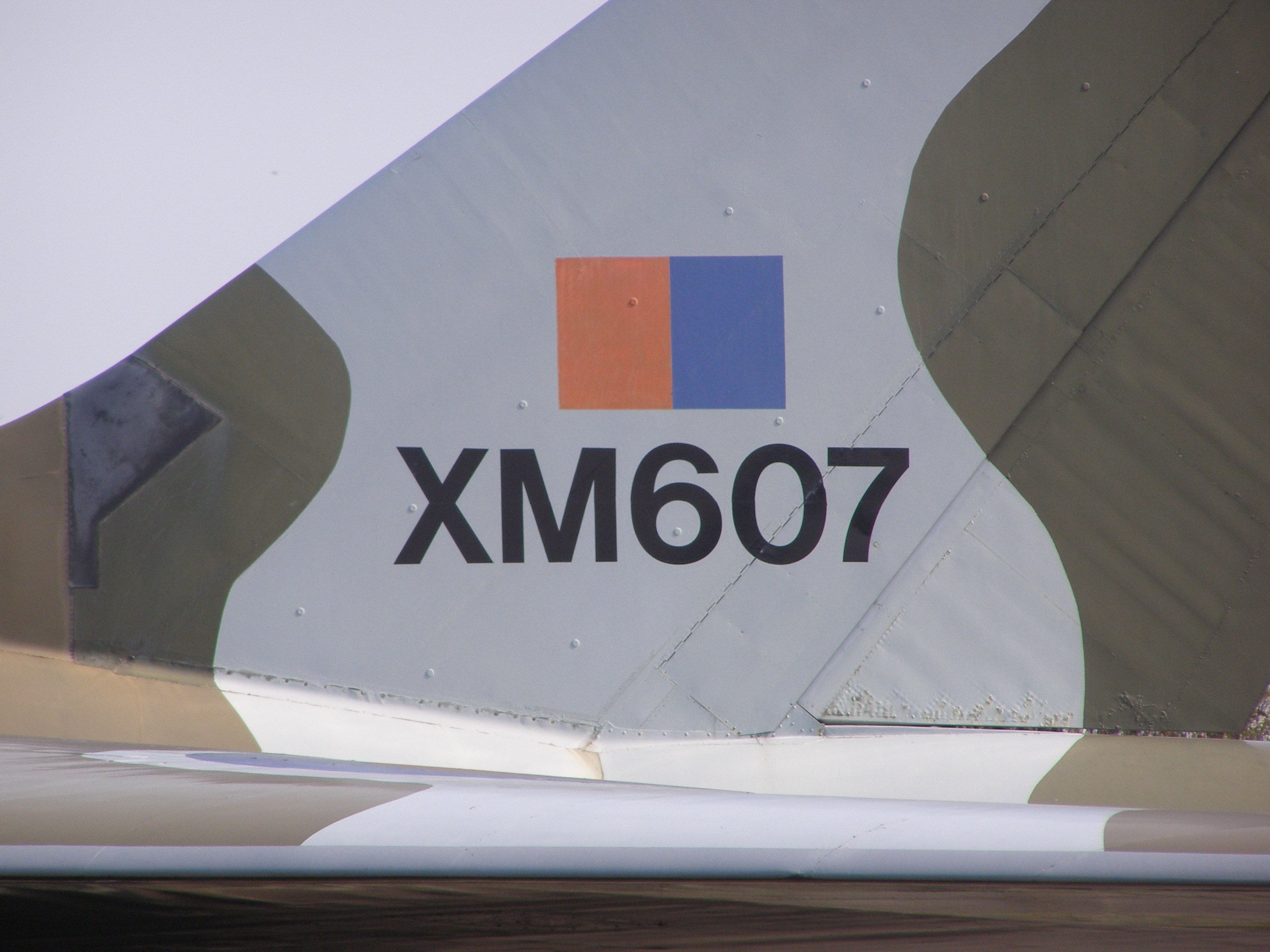
Avro Vulcan XM607 with the low-visibility fin flash

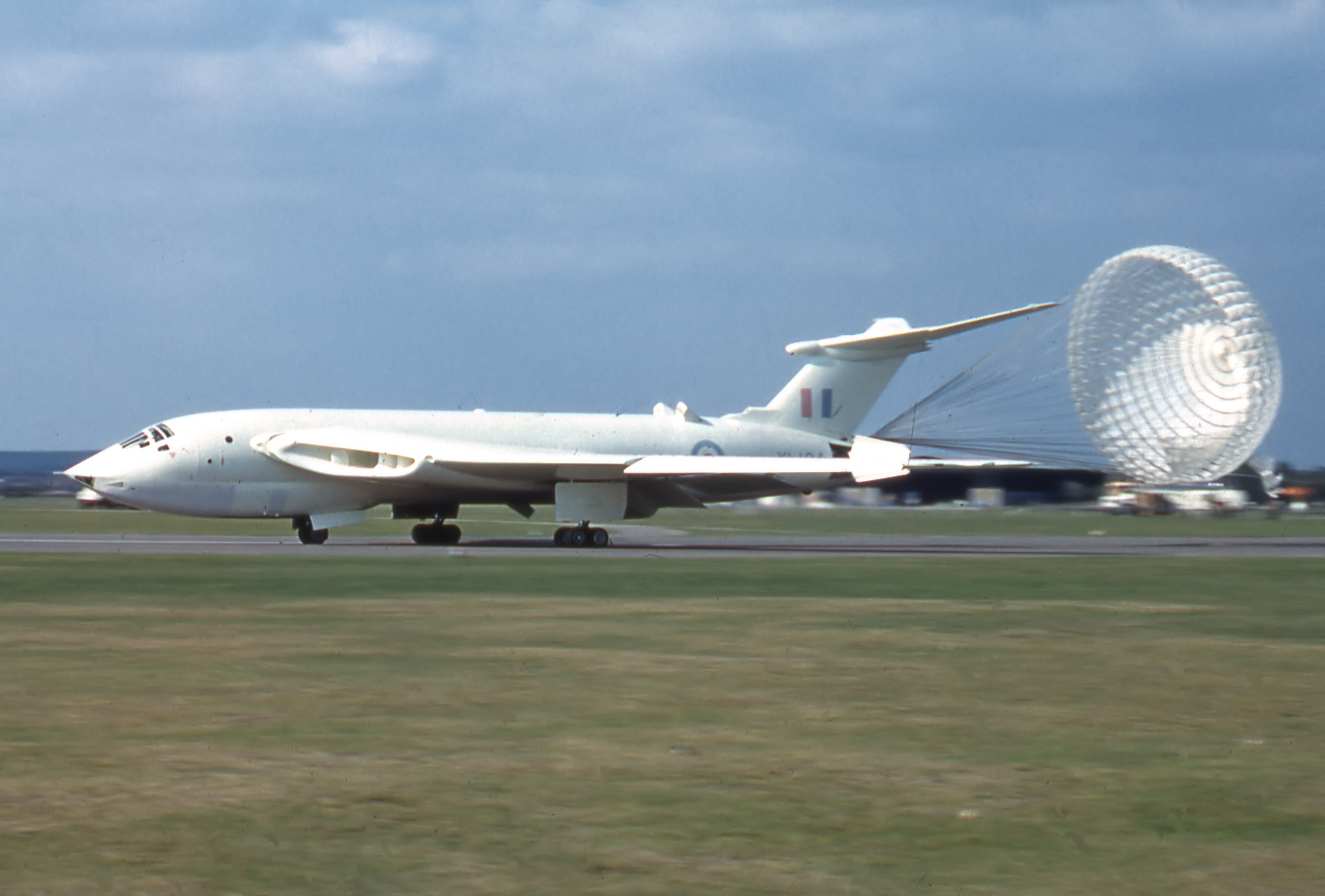
Handley Page Victor circa 1961 in anti-flash white with the pale fin flash.

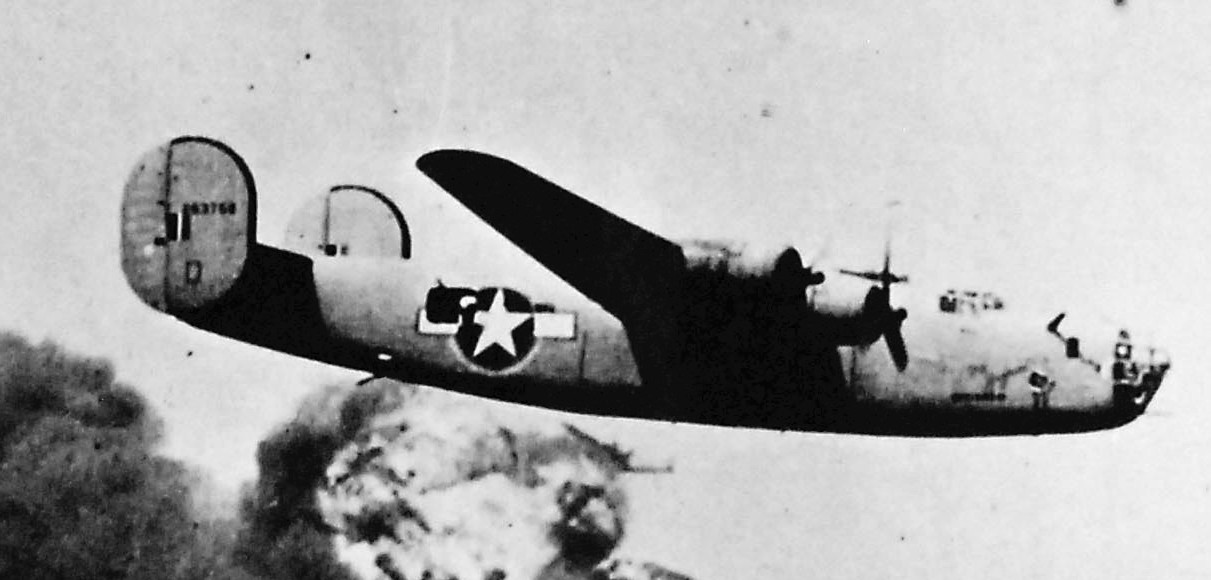
USAAF aircraft with RAF fin flashes

All current Royal Air Force aircraft carry a flash on the fin. This is either red/white/blue, or red/blue, the latter normally being used on camouflaged aircraft, with the red stripe forward. Aircraft painted anti-flash white in the nuclear strike role had a pale pink and blue flash, the same shades as the roundels, to reflect some of the thermal radiation from a nuclear explosion.

The Royal Navy and Army do not use the fin flash but have the words ROYAL NAVY or ARMY on the rear fuselage or fin instead. An exception to this was the Harrier GR7s and GR9s of the Naval Strike Wing, which carried similar markings to RAF Harriers. The fin flash can be rectangular, slanted or tapered, depending on aircraft type.

In a situation similar to that of the roundels, the fin flash was also shared with the air forces of Australia and New Zealand.

The fin flash evolved from the rudder stripes painted on the rudders of early RFC and RAF aircraft during the First World War, the markings being blue, white and red vertical stripes on the rudder. The fin flash of RNAS, RFC and RAF aircraft of the First World War was applied with the blue stripe forward. This orientation continued through to the late 1920s when it was reversed to have the red stripe forward in the order used through WW2 up to the present day. When applied to night bomber aircraft the red/blue fin flash was also blue forward through this period.

With the performance of aircraft increasing considerably during the 1930s, the practice of applying painted markings onto the (then manually powered) control surfaces was generally discontinued because of the need to rebalance the controls – failure to do this could have adverse effects on the surface's balance, possibly leading to flutter of the control surface at high airspeeds. It was for the same reason that the positioning of the wing roundels was revised so that they no longer encroached upon the ailerons.

In an attempt to conform to the appearance of French military aircraft, rudder stripes reappeared on aircraft (mainly Fairey Battles and Hawker Hurricanes) of the RAF based in France, starting in early September 1939. These stripes were painted in standard RAF colours in the order blue, white, red.

Fin flashes were officially adopted in June 1940. For the first six months there was no conformity in the width or height of the stripes and they were painted to cover as much of the fin area as possible. With occasional exceptions the order was red (leading edge), white, blue. In December 1940 type A fin flashes were standardised with a height of 27 in (690 mm), and an overall width of 24 in (610 mm), divided into three 8 inches (200 mm) red, white and blue stripes (e.g.: photo six, the Sea Hurricanes show this standardised fin flash). On some aircraft, e.g.; photo reconnaissance Spitfires the fin flash was about half these dimensions.

In July 1942, with the adoption of the type C and C1 roundels the fin flash became a 24 inches (61 cm) square for RAF fighters, the stripe widths becoming 11 inches (28 cm) red, 2 inches (5.1 cm) white and 11 inches (28 cm) blue. There were some exceptions; RAF North American Mustangs all used fin flashes which were 27 inches (69 cm) high by 24 inches (61 cm) wide. In early 1944 some aircraft types were painted in a "High-altitude" camouflage scheme and adopted type B roundels and fin flashes.

The then-current RAF fin flashes were also adopted for USAAF aircraft operating alongside British and Commonwealth forces in the Mediterranean theatre in 1942, appearing on US Curtiss P-40 Warhawk fighters and North American B-25 Mitchell bombers, as well as on USAAF Consolidated B-24 Liberators flying from North Africa on attacks such as 1943's Operation Tidal Wave.

== Colours ==
Roundel and fin-flash colours changed several times during the First World War because of severe problems with fading. The third standard (VB3 and VR3) would be used until the early 1930s when much brighter colours replaced the red and blue at the same time that rudder stripes were omitted. The red and blue were both duller and less saturated than later versions and varied considerably as paint was usually mixed locally. The actual switchover began in 1929 but new aircraft were still being delivered in 1932 with the earlier colours.

For the period from the early 1930s until 1938, Roundel Red was close to FS 595 21136 and the Roundel Blue was slightly lighter and brighter than FS 595 15056. Trainer Yellow was close to FS 595 23538. Photo 2, a restored Bristol F.2 Fighter, is a fairly good representation of the late interwar colours. On fabric covered aircraft these were glossy (as was the general finish) until dulled with age, even during the First World War.

In 1938, with the threat of war looming, new markings colours were introduced along with camouflage. The blue was darker, becoming similar to FS 595 25050 while the red became a slightly brownish brick-red, about FS 595 20109. The trainer yellow stayed the same shade but all colours were now matte. These colours remained standard for another eight years. To further complicate matters, old stocks continued to be used up. A series of colour photos of a Miles Master show wing and fuselage roundels (C and C1) in dull colours, while the fin flash remains in the bright pre-war colours, albeit with the later proportions. Other colour photos show a mixture of bright and dull colours being used on the same insignia, though all instances found have been of trainers.

Post-war colours were specified by the new BS 381 colour standard and approximate the late pre-war colours except for special cases, such as anti-flash markings and the current low visibility markings. The old blue colour, Aircraft Blue on BS381c was BS108. A new colour BS110, Roundel blue, made on Phthlalocyanine blue, was introduced in the early 1960s to improve weather fastness.

== In popular culture ==
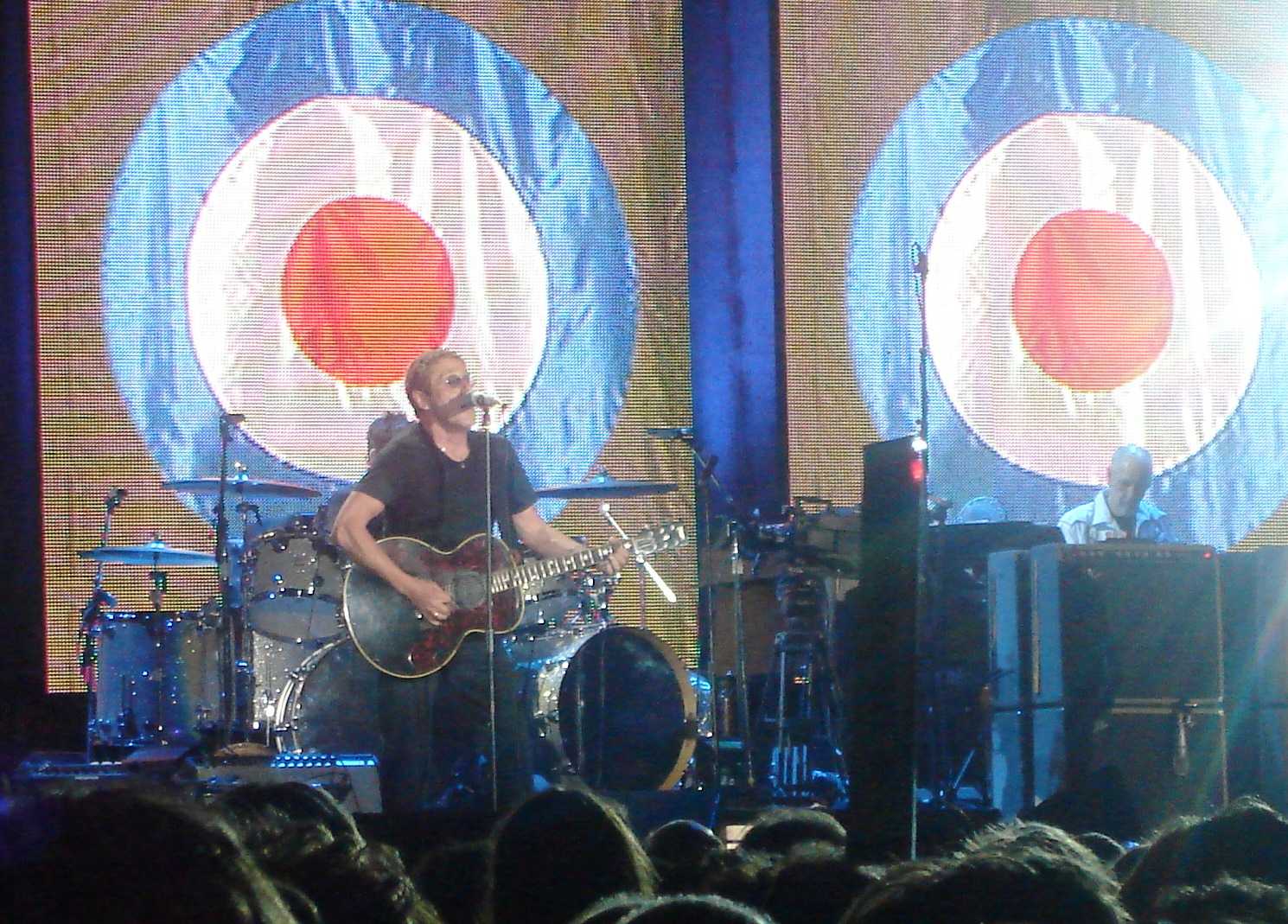
The Who performing in front of roundels

Roundels in general and the RAF roundel in particular have been associated with pop art of the 1960s, appearing in paintings by Jasper Johns and British artist Sir Peter Blake. It became part of the pop consciousness when British rock group The Who wore RAF roundels (and Union Flags) as part of their stage apparel at the start of their career. Subsequently it came to symbolise Mods and the Mod revival. The roundel is often used on clothing of the Ben Sherman brand.

== Gallery ==
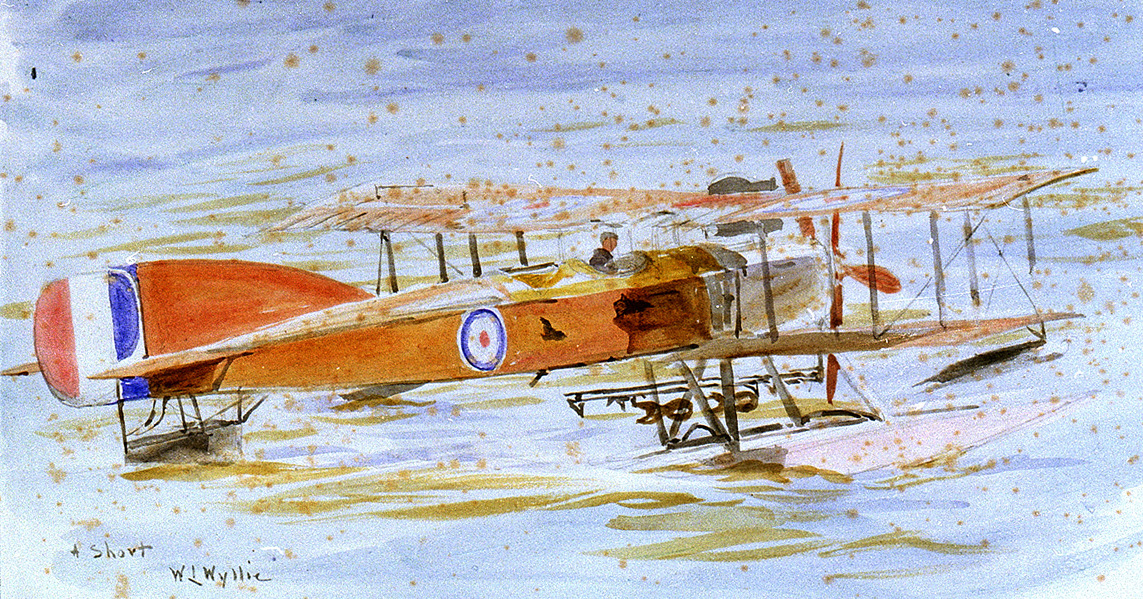
Short 184, 1917. Contemporary watercolour showing late First World War roundels, similar to later type A with white outer ring for contrast against PC.12 camouflage. Rudder stripes have blue forward.

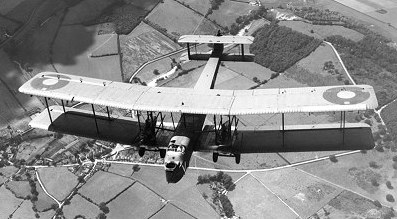
Vickers Virginia night bomber, 1922. Type B roundels in 6 locations.

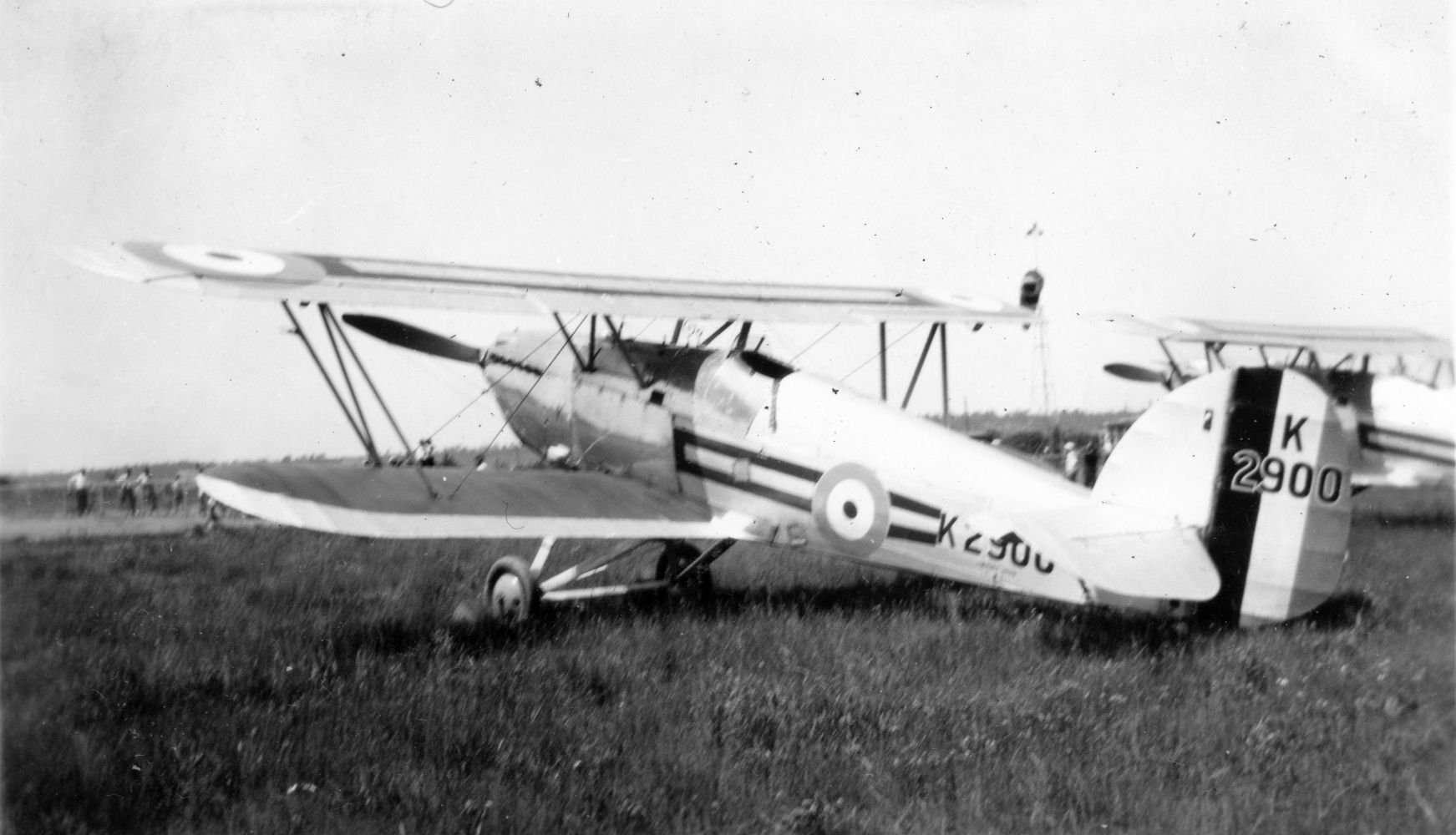
Hawker Fury, 1935. Type A roundels, still overlapping the ailerons. Rudder stripes have red forward.

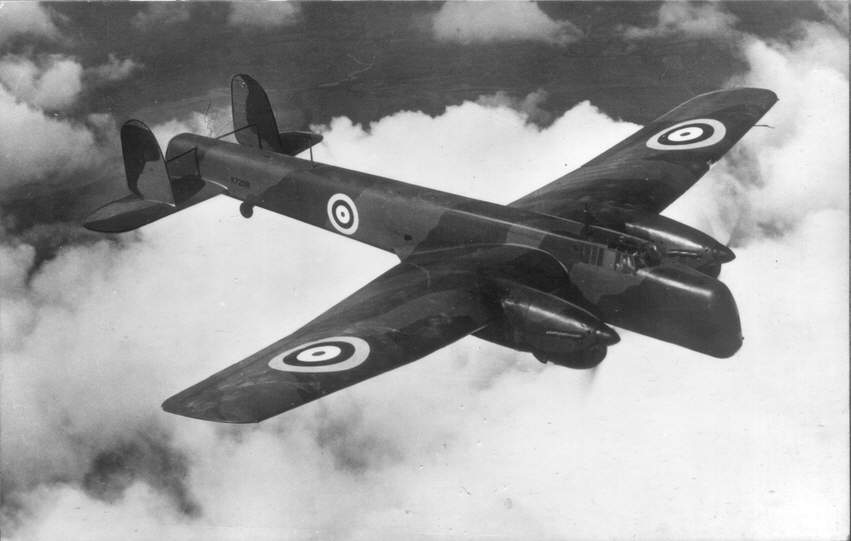
Armstrong Whitworth Whitley, 1938. Type A1 roundels on upper wings and fuselage side only and no fin flashes or rudder stripes.

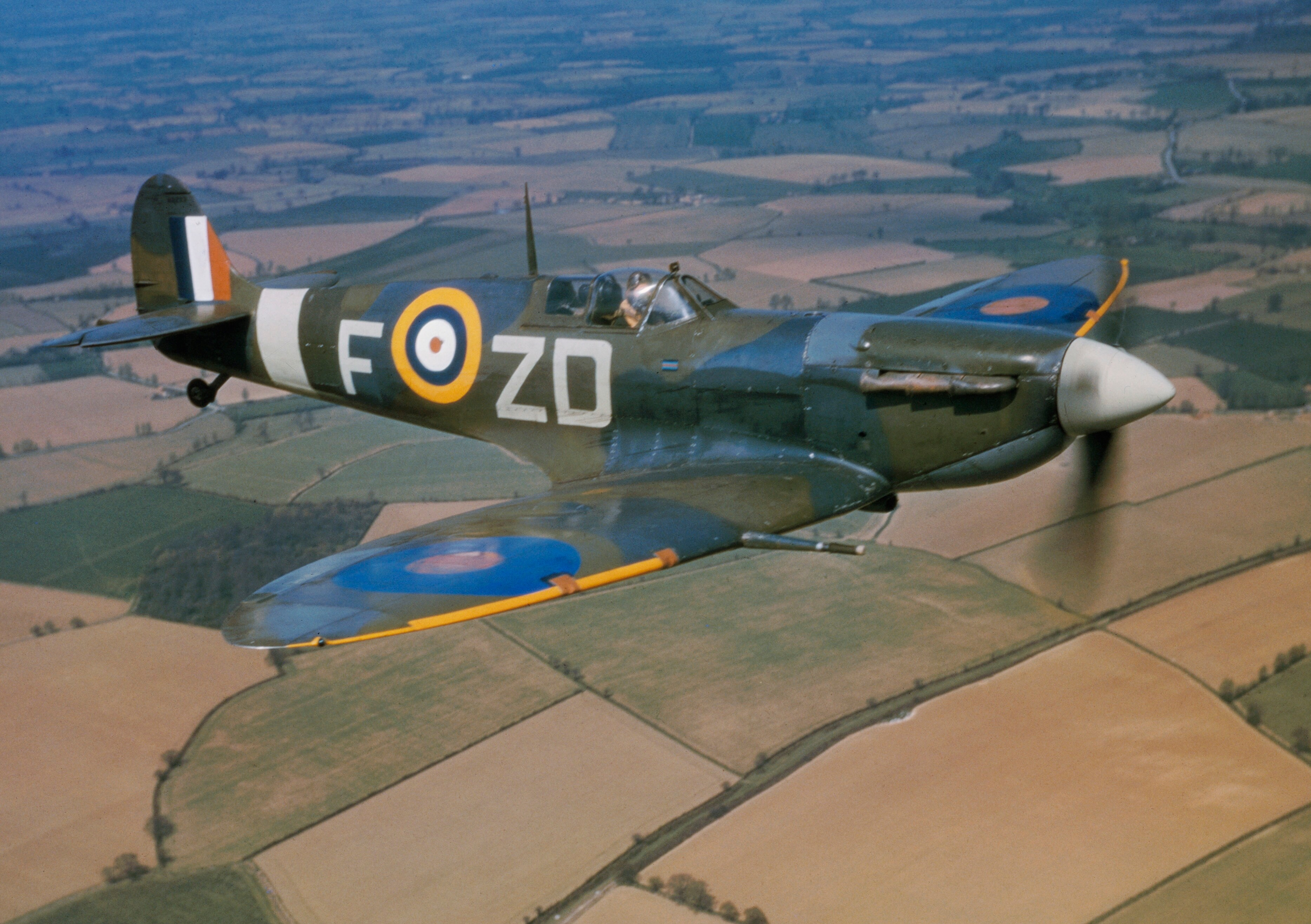
Supermarine Spitfire, May 1942. A1 fuselage roundel, B type wing roundels and full height fin flash.

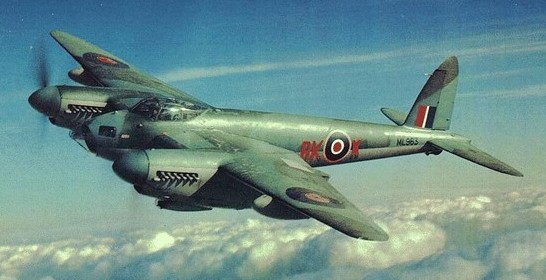
de Havilland Mosquito, 1944. Type B roundels on upper wings, type C1 on fuselage sides and type C fin flash used on aircraft from June 1942 to 1947.

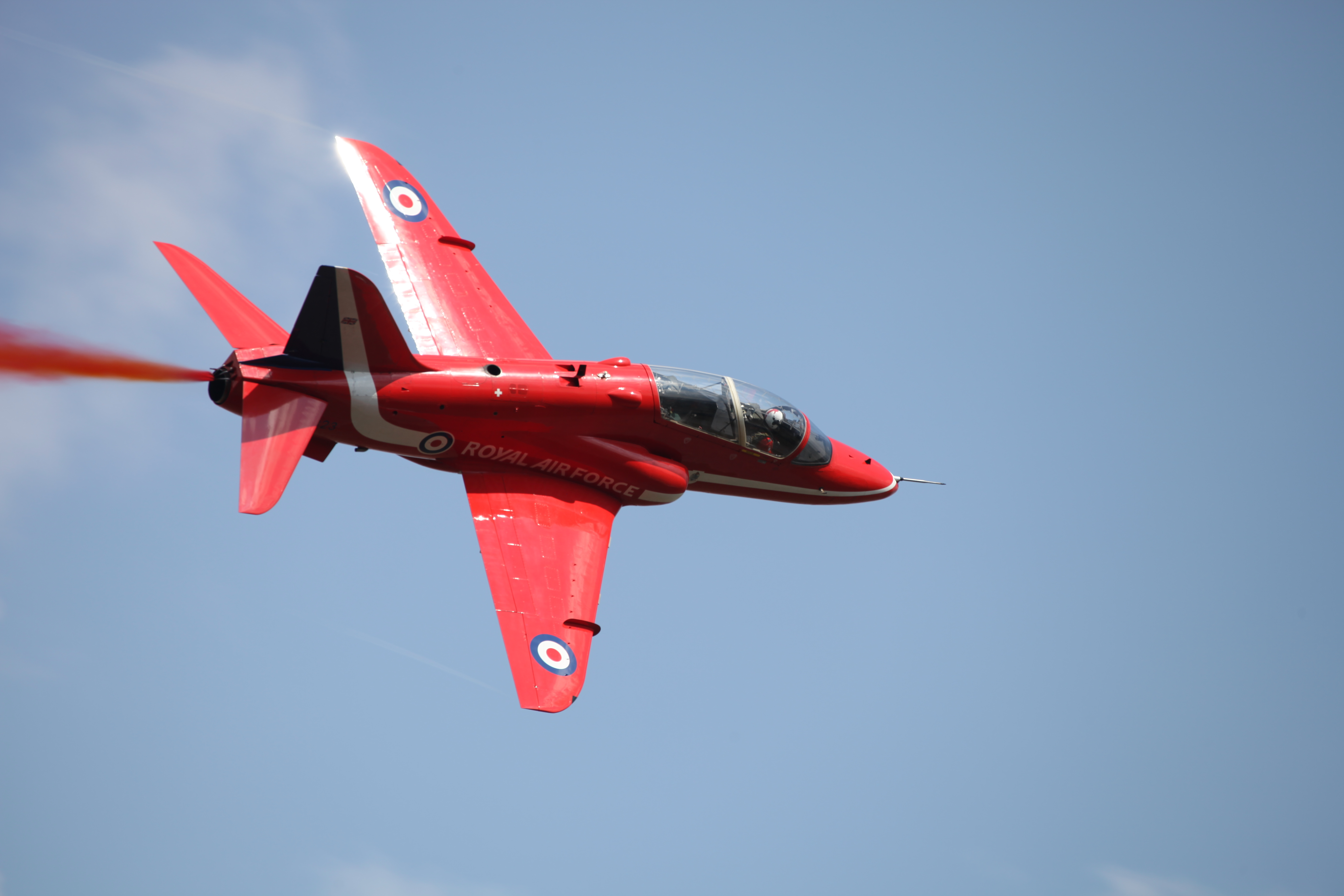
Red Arrows BAe Hawk, 2012, with type D roundels and non-standard fin markings

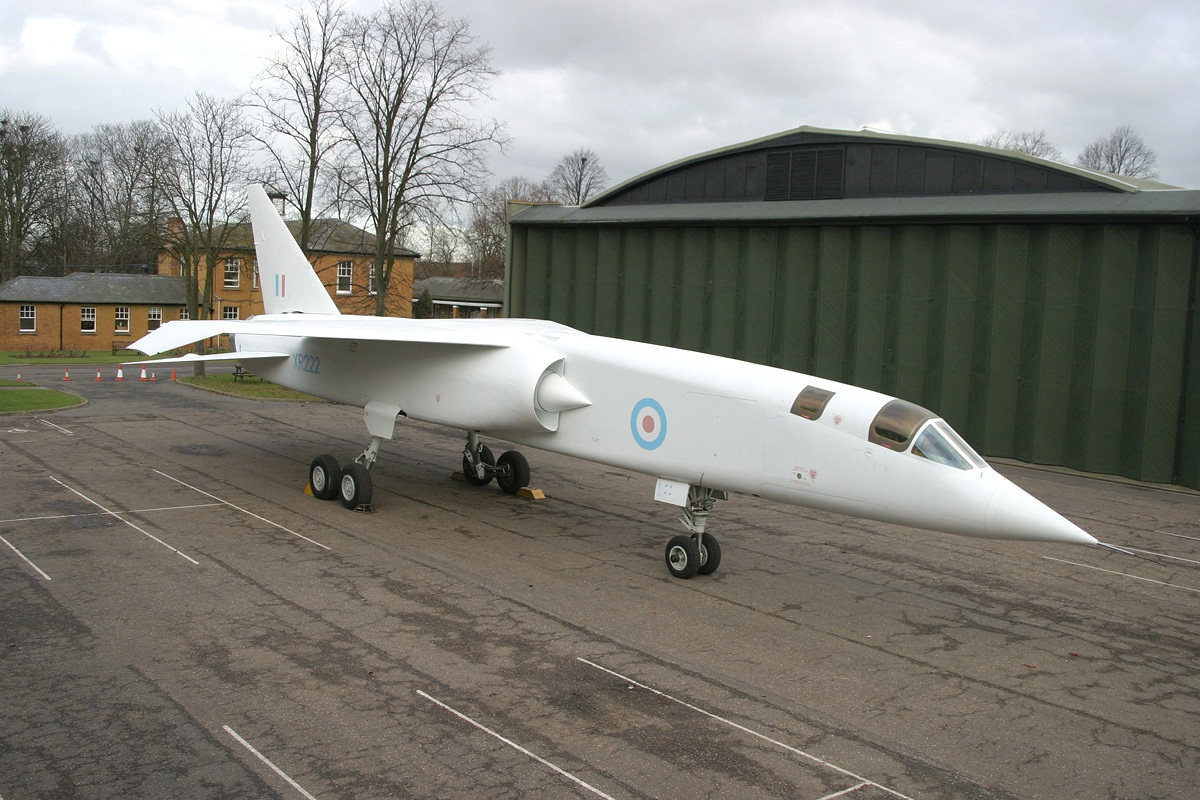
BAC TSR-2 in overall anti-flash white showing Type D Pale roundels

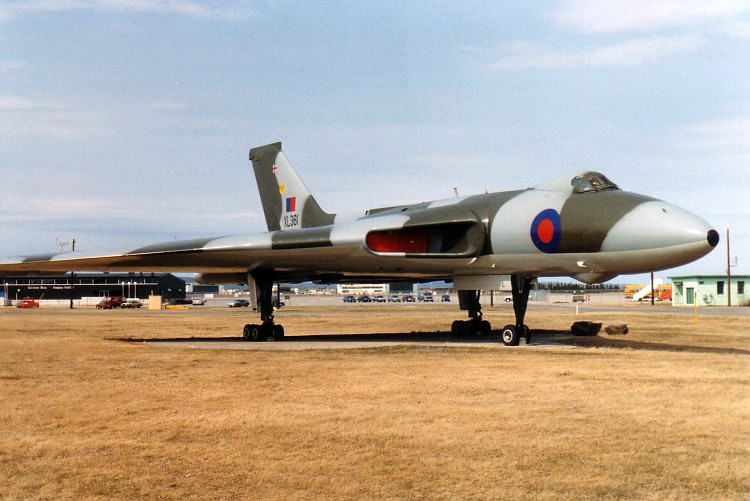
Avro Vulcan, 1988. Large low-visibility roundels, upper wings and fuselage with matching fin flash.

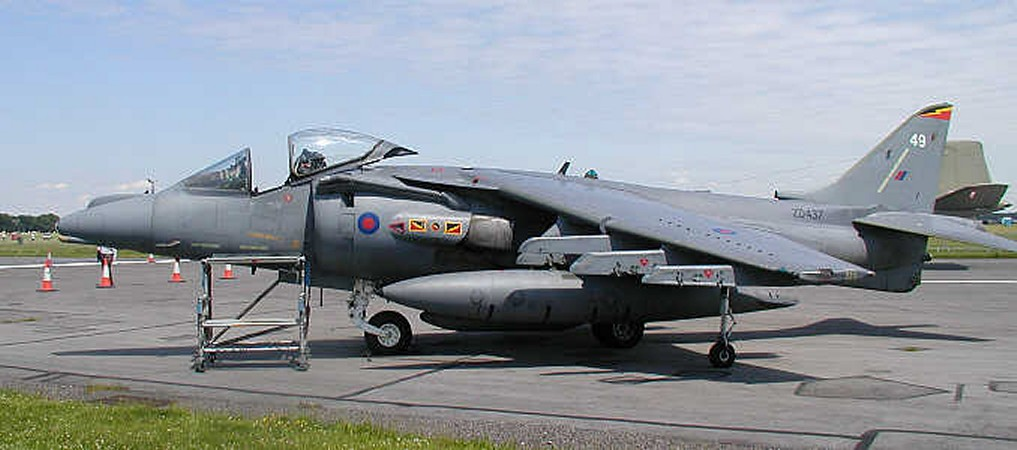
BAe Harrier II with small low-visibility roundels and fin flash

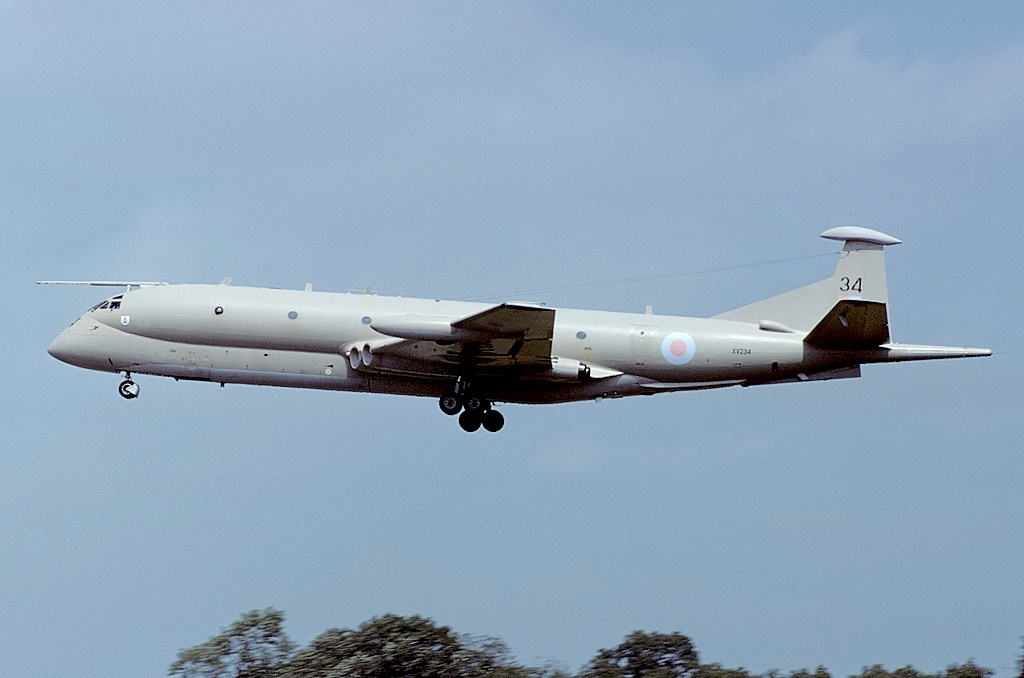
Hawker Siddeley Nimrod with salmon pink and pale blue low-visibility roundels.

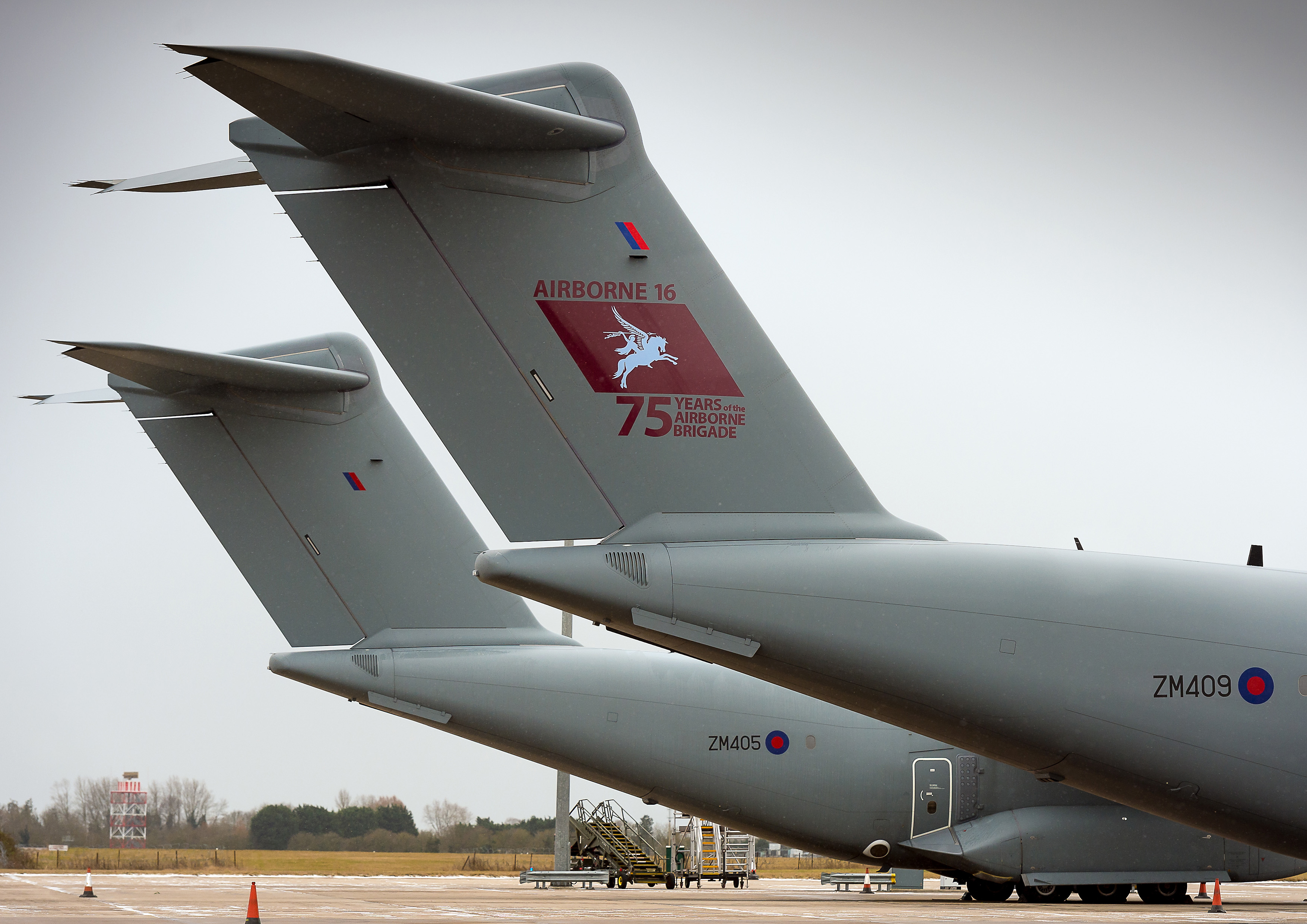
A400M Atlas with the two-colour low-visibility roundels and corresponding tail flash.

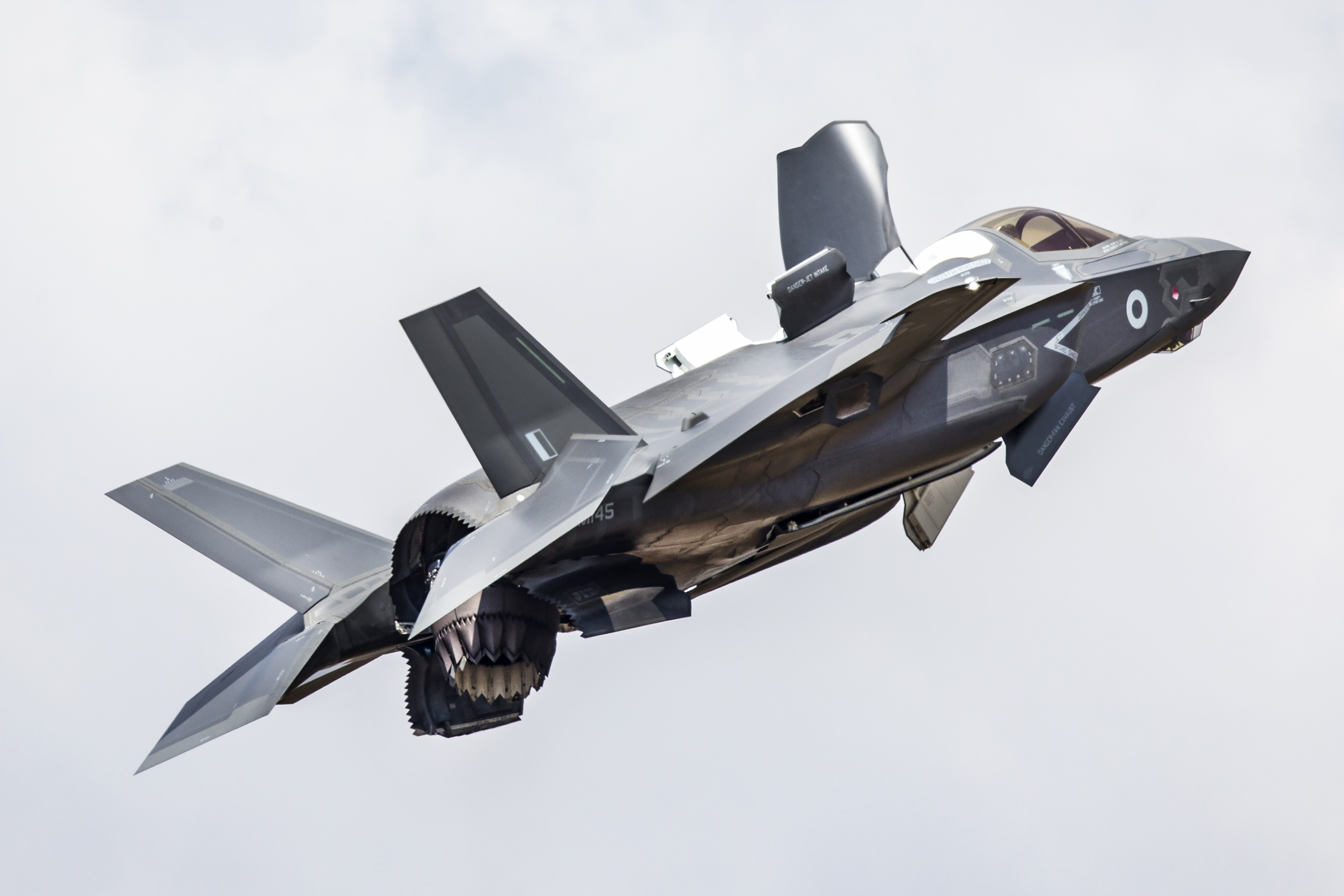
Lockheed Martin Lightning II showing fin flash and roundels of light and dark grey

== See also ==
- List of RAF Squadron Codes
- United Kingdom military aircraft registration number
- United Kingdom aircraft test serials
- British military aircraft designation systems
- Military aircraft insignia
