= SR Maunsell carriage =

British railway carriage

Southern Railway Maunsell carriage
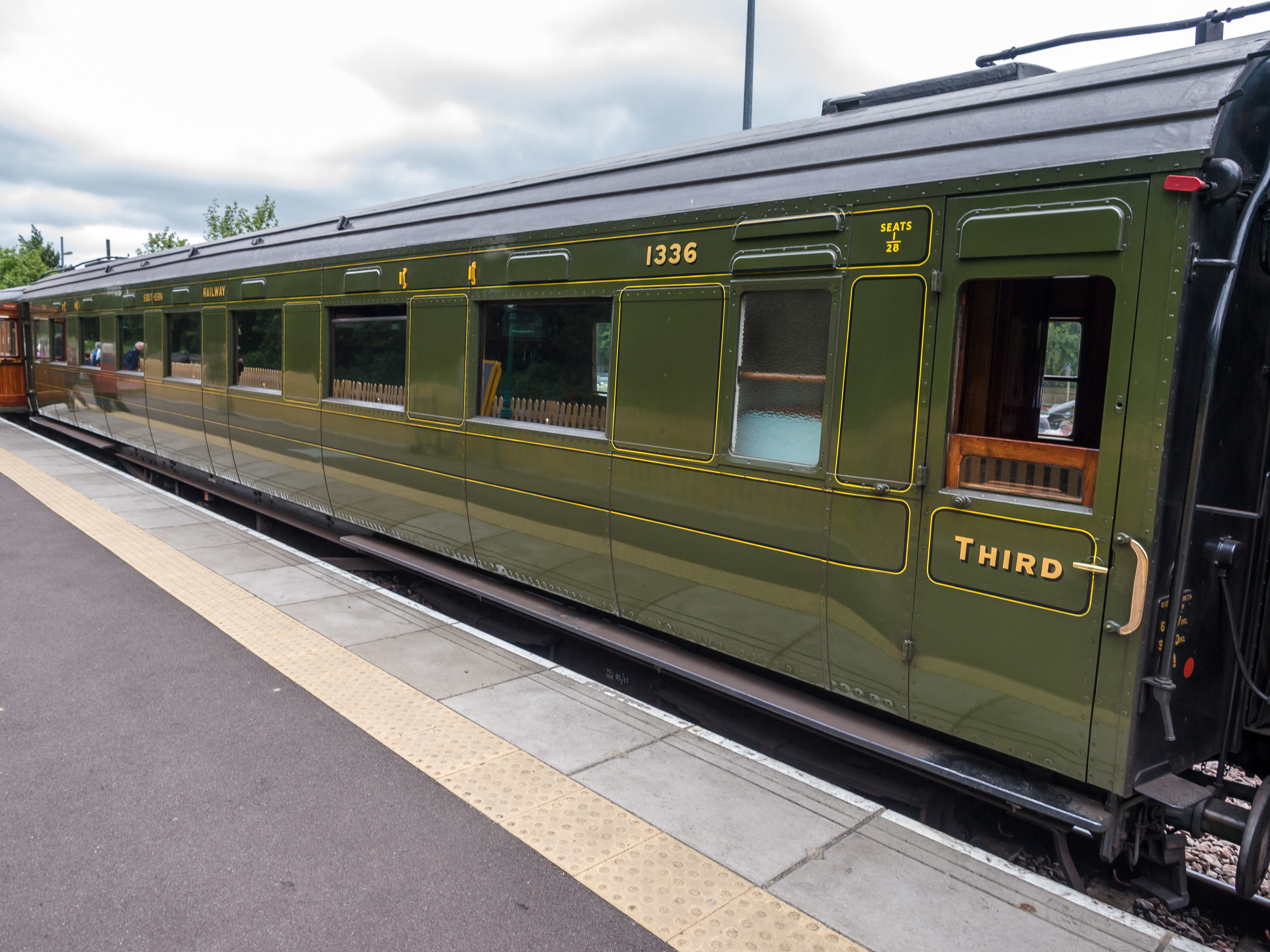

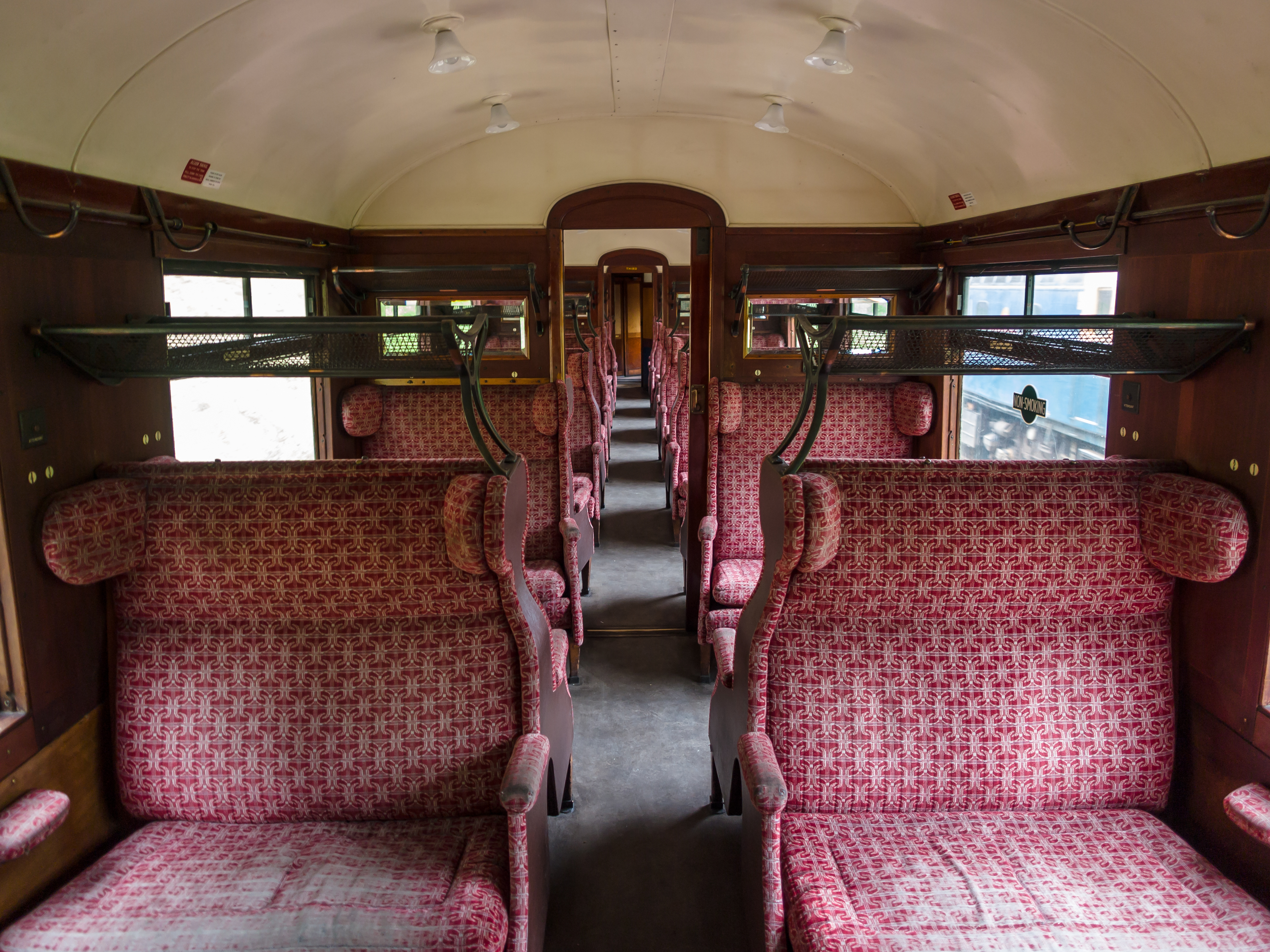
- In service: 1926–1967
- Manufacturer: Eastleigh
- Constructed: 1925–1936
- Number built: 1,200
- Number preserved: 33
- Number scrapped: 1,167
- Operators: Southern Railway and British Railways

Specifications
- Car body construction: Body-on-frame made of wood covered with steel sheeting
- Car length: 59 ft 0 in (17.98 m)
- Width: 9 ft 3 in (2.82 m)
- Height: 12 ft 4 in (3.76 m)
- Doors: hinged slam
- Weight: 32 long tons (33,000 kg)
- HVAC: Steam or electric or both
- Bogies: SR 8 ft steam bogies
- Braking system(s): automatic vacuum, air, or dual
- Coupling system: Drawhook or retractable knuckle coupler resting on drawhook
- Track gauge: 4 ft 8 1/2 in (1,435 mm)

The Southern Railway Maunsell carriage was the first design family of railway carriages built by Richard Maunsell for the Southern Railway (SR) in the United Kingdom. Following grouping in 1923, SR had continued to build carriages to the designs of the previous three main companies (the London and South Western Railway, London, Brighton and South Coast Railway and South Eastern and Chatham Railway railways), and the Maunsell carriage was intended to be the standard carriage design for use across the Southern Railway lines, incorporating the best features of each of the former companies' designs.

The Southern Railway believed in sets of carriages where groups of carriages stayed together for long periods of time. The set number always appeared at the brake end.

== Construction ==
In 1925, the first order was placed for the first Maunsell carriage. The coaches were 59 ft long with a width of 9 ft 3 in and a height of 12 ft 4 in. The bogies were SR built, with an 8 ft wheelbase. The third class compartments were 6 ft 3 in wide seating four passengers per side, while the first class compartments were 7 ft 1 3/4 in wide and seated three passengers per side.

The body frame was mostly made of wood with steel sheeting, the roof was made of wood with canvas over it, and the guard and luggage compartments had a width of 8 ft 7 in, with pressed steel bracket/inserts between the differences in widths from luggage to passenger compartments. The decision regarding gangways was decided in January 1924, with Pullman Gangways being adopted.

In total, over 1,200 Maunsell Carriages were built, with 139 sets being formed.

=== Early 59 ft corridor stock ===
The first batch of coaches was built for the West of England as three-coach sets with a brake third at either end and a composite in between. Ten sets were constructed, with numbers 390–399. The first batch was completed in October 1926. The seating capacity for a three-coach set was very low, with 24 first-class and 88 third-class seats. After the first batch, orders for a total of sixteen sets were completed by 1929.

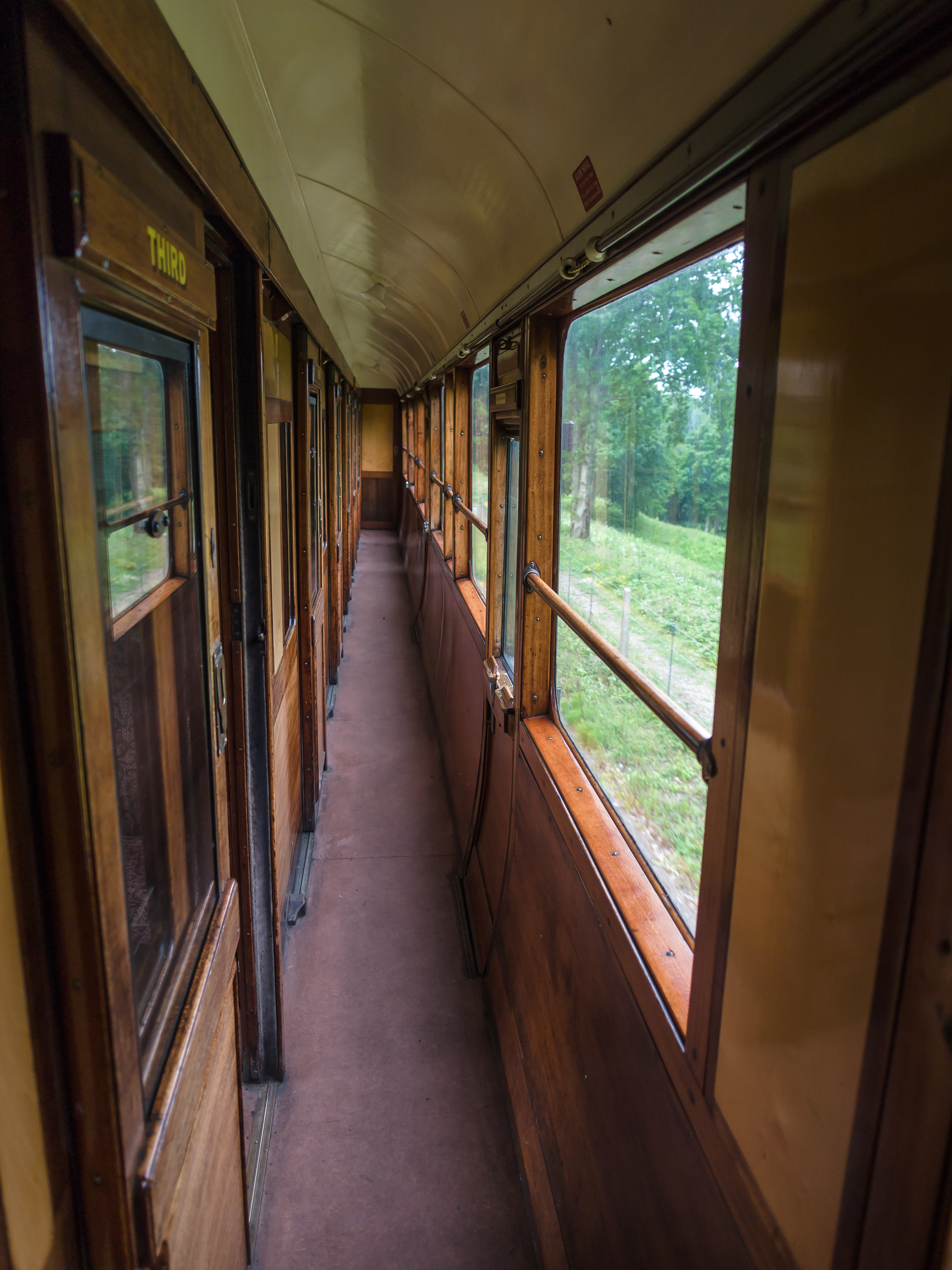
A Maunsell Brake Corridor Composite with high corridor Windows

=== 59 ft corridor stock (1929-1934) ===
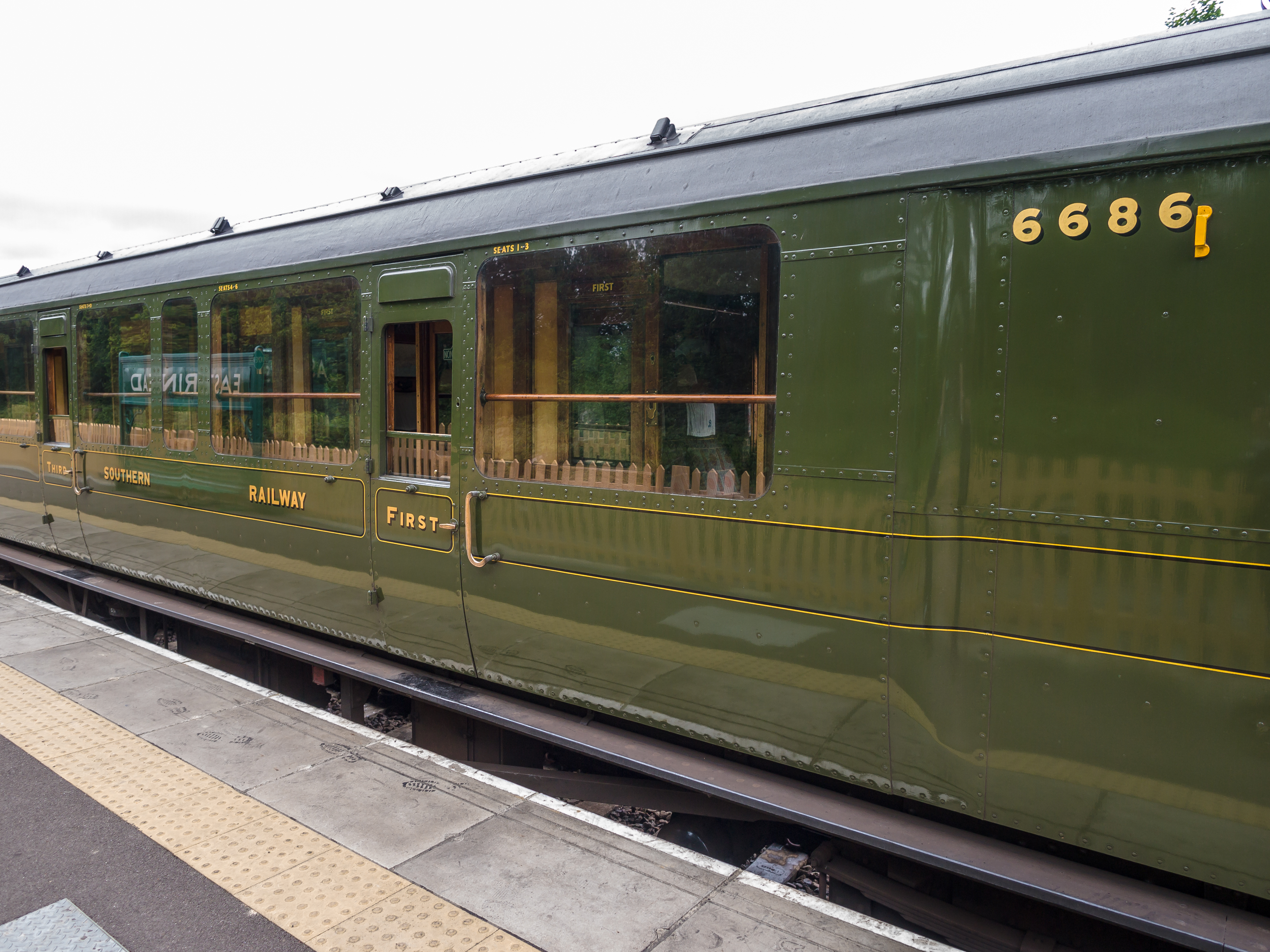
External view of a high corridor windowed Maunsell Brake Corridor Composite

In 1929, Maunsell modified his design to have high corridor windows, but the corridor windows at the ends of the coaches remained the same height to allow a destination board to be attached. The design was authorised in April 1928 and the first order was for 8 ft 3/4 in (2.457 m) wide stock for the low-clearance Hastings line. First Class compartments only seated two each side, Third Class three each side and roof board brackets were above the rain strip. The order also included 8 ft 6 in (2.59 m) wide coaches for the Folkestone line. A total of 77 sets were completed by 1934.

=== Later 59 ft corridor stock ===
In early 1933, the Southern Railway announced that 1,065 Maunsell carriages were built. Most of the carriages built after 1934 were flush-sided and each toilet now had two sliding ventilator glasses and there were a few other minor alterations. Forty-six sets were built.

=== Maunsell Post Office vans ===
In 1923, the Southern Railway inherited two main TPO services from the London and South Western Railway and South Eastern and Chatham Railway. The services were provided by pre-grouping carriages, but in 1936 a pre production model No. 4919 was built and an order placed in 1939 for a Maunsell-designed Post Office sorting van (POSV) with two types: a sorting van of which four were built (including a pre-production model) and a tender van (POTV) of which four were built; they both have offset gangways.

Three examples have been preserved, two POSVs, 4922 at the Bluebell Railway and 4920 the Nene Valley Railway, and one POTV, 4958, at the Pontypool and Blaenavon Railway.

=== Maunsell push-pull sets ===
In 1959, British Railways (BR) started to convert twenty Maunsell brake composites and open seconds. The brake composites in each set had the lavatory sealed off and the gangway at the brake end removed. A driving end was provided with two small windows fitted overlooking the track. The Open Seconds had their lavatories removed and sealed off and gangway to the locomotive end removed. The sets were numbered 600–619.

In preservation, two driving brake corridor and an open third survived, No. 6699, 6697 and 1323, all of which are at the Swanage Railway. The Swanage Railway want to create an authentic push-pull set with 6699 and 1323, forming Set No. 619.

== Southern Railway use ==
The first sets that entered service in 1935 were assigned to the west area of the network and gradually spread all over the network, The Maunsell coaching stock gradually replacing old pre-grouping stock. The coaches were always operated in sets with loose stock placed in sets when carriages were in overhaul.

=== Accidents involving Maunsell-built coaches 1927-1947 ===
- Sevenoaks, 24 August 1927. 5:00 pm Cannon Street to Deal eight-car train derailed with four coaches damaged beyond repair.
- Dover Marine, July 1935. Four coaches destroyed by fire.
- Micheldever, 15 August 1936. A fire broke out on the 4:58 pm Channel Islands boat train, destroying four coaches in the resulting blaze.
- Swanley Junction, March 1938. Two coaches including a Thanet Composite were fire damaged.
- Haywards Heath, 2 September 1945. Shunting accident which killed two, two coaches destroyed.
- Woking, 10 November 1945. The 4:54 pm Waterloo to Basingstoke train struck the 5.00 pm Waterloo to Exeter train. Some major damage to coaches.
- Catford, 20 September 1946. The 2:10 pm Victoria to Ramsgate train derailed which killed one, three coaches destroyed.
- Farnborough, 26 November 1947. 3:05 pm Ilfracombe to Waterloo train collided at 20 mph into the back of the Bournemouth to Waterloo train killing one person and destroying three carriages.

During World War II between 1940 and 1944, sixteen Southern Railway-built coaches were destroyed in a number of different raids, and many more were damaged but repaired and returned to service.

=== Liveries ===
Maunsell stock in the Southern Railway had two main liveries, the first of which was introduced by Maunsell and lasted to 1939 before Bulleid modernized the coloring in 1940.

- SR Maunsell olive green (1924–1939; introduced as the first standard passenger livery for the Southern Railway)
- SR Bulleid malachite green (1939–1950; became standard livery for all Southern passenger locomotives)

== British Railways use ==
The policy under which the Southern Railway operated set trains continued into the Southern Region of British Railways; sets were disbanded and created as BR tried to create a new timetable. Since 1949, the official livery for all main line coaches had been crimson and cream, in seven years the whole of the Southern Region fleet should be crimson and cream but that wasn't the case as many sets were still in Southern Railway malachite green. In 1959, as the Kent Coast electrification scheme was completed most restriction '0' (Note: built to a narrower profile suitable for use through the limited clearances of tunnels on the Tonbridge to Hastings route inherited from the South Eastern & Chatham Railway) were withdrawn at the same time. This decline continued as BR had more modern Bulleid and Mark 1 coaching stock until 1967 where the last was withdrawn. Many Maunsell coaches were sold by BR to heritage railways were they restored and operated.

== Preservation ==
The carriages are well represented in preservation, with 33 preserved on heritage railways across the country. Two driving brake composite, four corridor composite, five brake third corridor two are under frames, one dining saloon, one kitchen first, two brake corridor composite, four brake unclassed open, five third open, two Post Office sorting van, two corridor third (one is an underframe), one corridor first under frame, one open second under frame, one Post Office tender van, and two unknown underframe.

Origin	Number	Type	Location	Notes	Photograph
Southern Railway	5644	Corridor Composite	Bluebell Railway	Built in 1930, stored awaiting restoration. Restriction '4' coach originally assigned to set 195 before going to set 455 in 1956 and set 195 in 1957, it was withdrawn in 1961. Purchased in 1989 from Chipmans as part of CWT Set 8. This carriage has had its roof recovered but it was found the previous roof covering had been damaged and allowed water ingress. The carriage will require replacement cant rails and eradication of dry rot as part of its restoration. It's considered to be one of the gems of the Bluebell's Maunsell fleet.	
Southern Railway	7866	Dining Saloon	Bluebell Railway	Built in 1927. Originally numbered 1365, Stored awaiting overhaul. Restriction '4' coach Altered to dining car in 1954 it was withdrawn in 1963. On arrival to the Bluebell, it was coupled to 7864, as a static buffet arrangement. It was returned to passenger traffic in 1970 after being used on passenger trains regularly in the 1970s until it was removed from traffic pending a major overhaul, which it still awaits.	
Southern Railway	7864	Kitchen First	Bluebell Railway	Built in 1932. Stored undercover. Restriction '4' coach altered to kitchen car in 1947, it was withdrawn in 1962. Slated to be one of the next coaches restored for creating a set available for regular use with the Maunsell locomotives.	
Southern Railway	6575	Brake Corridor Composite	Bluebell Railway	Built in 1929. Stored awaiting a fairly major overhaul, particularly at the brake end. Restriction '4' coach originally loose before going to set 23 in 1948, it was withdrawn in 1959. The carriage has recently been repainted into Bluebell Blue livery to be partnered with Stepney as part of the 50th Anniversary celebrations. This carriage also featured in a limited edition Hornby pack bought out for the 50th Anniversary.	
Southern Railway	4444	Brake Unclassed open	Bluebell Railway	Built in 1933. Out of service awaiting restoration. Restriction '1' coach originally loose before being converted to ambulance car 7921, it was withdrawn in 1959. Its companion 4441 was affected by dry rot before it arrived on the Bluebell, and this has not been eliminated. It is planned to donate 4444's underframe to the better-condition 4441.	
Southern Railway	4441	Brake Unclassed open	Bluebell Railway	Built in 1933. Awaiting overhaul with a seriously damaged underframe, but a reasonably complete body. Restriction '1' coach originally loose before going to set 181 in 1962, it was withdrawn in 1965. It's planned to swap underframes with 4444 in the fullness of time, so this one can be restored.	
Southern Railway	6686	Brake Corridor Composite	Bluebell Railway	Built in 1935. Operational, won the 'Highly Commended Coach of the Year' award for 1998/99. Restriction '4' coach that has always been loose, it was withdrawn in 1966.	
Southern Railway	1336	Third Open	Bluebell Railway	Built in 1933. In service and used on passenger trains. Restriction '4' coach that has always been loose, it was withdrawn in 1961. It was restored from stripped-out ex-departmental condition.	
Southern Railway	1309	Third Open	Bluebell Railway	Built in 1935. In service and used on passenger trains. Restriction '4' coach originally that has always been loose, it was withdrawn in 1962. This coach is unique in preservation, and was restored from stripped-out departmental condition, in part thanks to parts stripped from identical No. 1306 when the latter was in a scrap yard. On restoration in 1984, it won the first ever ARPS (now HRA) "Coach of the Year" award. As of 2016 it remains in regular service, with minimal further work having been required in the interim, although it is due a re-trim of seating which should have occurred during 2014.	
Southern Railway	2356	Corridor Third	Bluebell Railway	Built in 1931. Awaiting overhaul. Restriction '1' coach originally in set 217 before being loose in 1959, it was withdrawn in 1961. It was used for some years as the Carriage and Wagon Department Mess Coach. Overhaul possible in the future.	
Southern Railway	3687	Brake Third Corridor	Bluebell Railway	Built in 1931. In service and used on passenger trains. Restriction '0' coach originally in set 214, it was withdrawn in 1961. The interior was completed and the doors have had all their timberwork overhauled and fitted. Entered traffic in 31st May 2025.	
Southern Railway	3724	Brake Third Corridor	Bluebell Railway	Built in 1930. Stripped out and rebuilt for use on Chipmans weed-killer train. Stored awaiting restoration, following use as an exhibition vehicle. Restriction '4' coach originally in set 207, it was withdrawn in 1962. During its eventual restoration it may be converted into a wheelchair-accessible coach on passenger trains.	
Southern Railway	4922	Post Office Sorting Van	Bluebell Railway	Built in 1939. Awaiting Restoration. Restriction '4' coach originally in set 207, it was withdrawn in 1977.	
Southern Railway	3725	Brake Third Corridor	Colne Valley Railway	Built in 1930. Under frame only used as a crane runner. Restriction '4' coach originally in set 207, it was withdrawn in 1962.	
Southern Railway	MAT 94117 (Not SR number)	Not Known	Gloucestershire and Warwickshire Railway	Underframe only	
Southern Railway	1019	Corridor Third	Isle of Wight Steam Railway	Built in 1933. Under frame only. Restriction '0' coach originally loose before going to set 938 in 1958, it was withdrawn in 1959.	
Southern Railway	5618	Corridor Composite	Kent and East Sussex Railway	Built in 1931. In service and used on passenger trains. Restriction '1' originally in set 189 before being withdrawn in 1965. Undergoing repaint, new roof canvas fitting and minor repairs as of 29 July 2018.	
Southern Railway	7400	Corridor First	Kent and East Sussex Railway	Built in 1929. Under frame only. Restriction '0' originally loose before going to set 480 then loose again in 1959 and withdrawn in 1961.	
Southern Railway	7798	Open Second	Kent and East Sussex Railway	Built in 1931. Under frame only. Restriction '4' originally loose before going to set 434 in 1956, before being withdrawn in 1959.	
Southern Railway	5153	Corridor Composite	Kent and East Sussex Railway	Built in 1928. Awaiting restoration. Restriction '1' originally in set 467 before going to set 466 in 1963 before being withdrawn in 1965.	
Southern Railway	4432	Brake Unclassed Open	Kent and East Sussex Railway	Built in 1933. In service and used on passenger trains. Restriction '4' originally loose before going to set 452 in 1962 before being withdrawn in 1965.	
Southern Railway	4443	Brake Unclassed Open	Kent and East Sussex Railway	Built in 1933. In service and used on passenger trains. Restriction '4' originally loose before going to set 452 in 1962 and set 462 in 1963 before being withdrawn in 1965.	
Southern Railway	4920	Post Office Sorting Van	Nene Valley Railway	Built in 1939. Stored. Restriction '4' coach.	
Southern Railway	4958	Post Office Tender Van	Pontypool and Blaenavon Railway	Built in 1939. Awaiting Restoration. Restriction '4' coach.	
Southern Railway	3690	Brake Third Corridor	Robertsbridge railway station	Built in 1931. Awaiting Restoration. Restriction '0' originally in set 216 before being loose in 1960 withdrawn in 1961.	Maunsell 3690
Southern Railway	1323	Third Open	Swanage Railway	Built in 1932. Stored pending restoration. Exterior mostly complete, interior incomplete. Restriction '4' originally loose before going to set 611 in 1960 and then withdrawn in 1964. Converted to Push/Pull carriage in 1959. Stored off main site. To form a Push-Pull Set with 6699 when restored to working order.	
Southern Railway	1346	Third Open	Swanage Railway	Built in 1933. Under Restoration. Restriction '4' originally loose before going to set 269 in 1954, loose again in 1959 and withdrawn in 1961. Restoration continuing at the Swanage Railway following initial phase of work at Ramparts, Derby.	
Southern Railway	1381	Third Open	Swanage Railway	Built in 1930. Restoration completed October 2019 and now in service. Restriction '4'. Originally loose, it was withdrawn in 1961. Initial phase of restoration took place at Ramparts, Derby, before interior works undertaken at the Swanage Railway.	
Southern Railway	2768	Brake Third Corridor	Swanage Railway	Built in 1932. Under frame only. Restriction '4' originally in set 232 it was withdrawn in 1962.	
Southern Railway	6699	Driving Brake Composite	Swanage Railway	Built in 1935. Awaiting Restoration. Restriction '4' originally in set 198 before going to set 619 in 1960, loose in 1963 and withdrawn later that year. Converted to Push/Pull carriage in 1959, stored off main site to form a Push-Pull Set with 1323 when restored to working order.	
Southern Railway	6697	Driving Brake Composite	Swanage Railway	Built in 1935. Under frame only. Restriction '4' originally in set 196 before going to set 618 in 1960, loose in 1963 and withdrawn later that year. Converted to Push/Pull carriage in 1959. Reduced to under frame only in 2018 due to severe deterioration in open storage. Underframe retained as potentially in better condition than 6699.	
Southern Railway	5600	Corridor Composite	Wishaw	Built in 1931. Awaiting restoration. Restriction '0' originally loose before going to set 478 in 1959, it was withdrawn later that year.	
Southern Railway	185392 (Not SR number)	Not Known	Swindon and Cricklade Railway	Under frame only	
