= NIVO =

Type of aircraft finish

Colour coordinates
- Hex triplet: #404735
- sRGB^{B} (r, g, b): (64, 71, 53)
- HSV (h, s, v): (83°, 25%, 28%)
- CIELCh_{uv} (L, C, h): (29, 12, 104°)
- Source: Federal Standard 595
- B: Normalized to [0–255] (byte)

NIVO, abbreviated from Night Invisible Varnish Orfordness (or "Night Varnish Orfordness"), was a dark grey-green overall finish applied to British night bomber aircraft in the inter-war period (1918–1939).

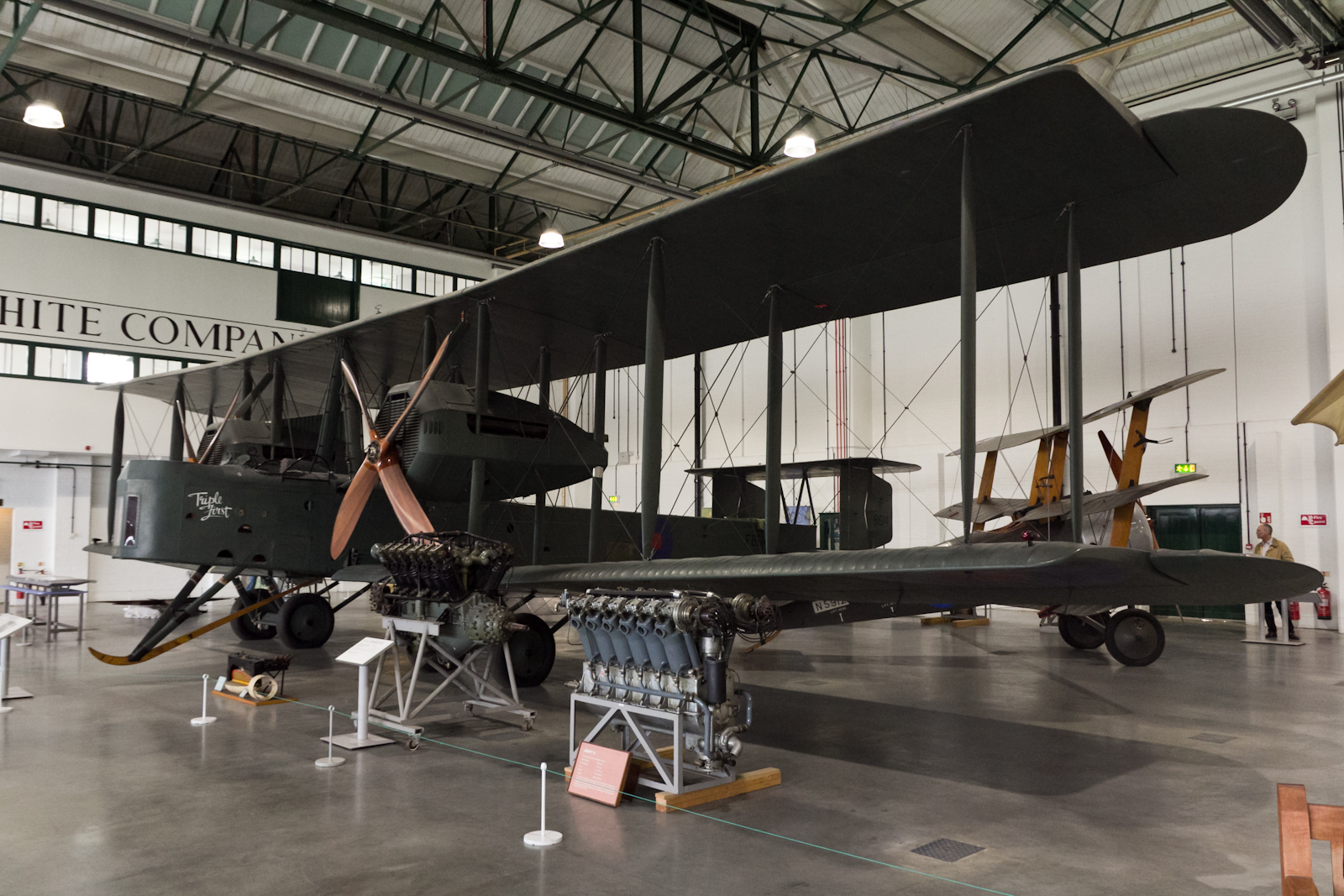
NIVO-finished Vickers Vimy serial F8614 at the RAF Museum London

Developed in 1918 by the experimental station at Orford Ness, as a low-visibility colouring for the Royal Air Force it had a sheen to match that of open water on a moonlit night.

It was applied to aircraft from 1918 and was used on the Vickers Virginia, Handley Page Hyderabad, Handley Page Hinaidi, Handley Page Heyfords and Fairey Hendon bombers.

By the mid-1930s, tests had determined that the varnish was too reflective when searchlights were shone on it. NIVO was phased out in the late 1930s, and had been discontinued by the time of the arrival of the new British medium bombers – the Vickers Wellington, Handley Page Hampden and Armstrong Whitworth Whitley.

NIVO is covered by Federal Standard 595 colour FS:34096
