= Federal Standard 595 =

United States federal standard defining color shades

Federal Standard 595, known as SAE AMS-STD-595 – Colors Used in Government Procurement, formerly FED-STD-595, is a United States Federal Standard for colors, issued by the General Services Administration.

== History ==
=== FED-STD-595, 595A, and 595B ===
Federal Standard 595 is the color description and communication system developed in 1956 by the United States government. Its origins reach back to World War II when a problem of providing exact color specifications to military equipment subcontractors in different parts of the world became a matter of urgency.

Similarly to other color standards of the pre-digital era, such as RAL colour standard or British Standard 4800, Federal Standard 595 is a color collection rather than a color space. The standard is built upon a set of color shades where a unique reference number is assigned to each color. This collection is then printed on sample color chips and provided to interested parties. In contrast, modern color systems such as the Natural Color System (NCS) are built upon a color space paradigm, providing for much more flexibility and wider range of applications.

Each color in the Federal Standard 595 range is identified by a five-digit code. The colors in the standard have no official names, just numbers.

The initial standard FED-STD-595 issued in March 1956 contained 358 colors. Revision A issued in January 1968 counted 437 colors. Revision B Change 1 from January 1994 counted 611 colors.

=== FED-STD-595C ===
Federal Standard 595C was published January 16, 2008. No previous colors were removed. Thirty-nine new colors were added for a total of 650 colors. On July 31, 2008 595C Change Order 1 was published, changing the numbers of eight of the colors added in revision C. The revision C master reference list of colors provides all available reference information for these colors, including tristimulus values, pigments and 60° gloss level and color name as applicable. As before, all color matching must still be done via color reference chips.

Many prime contractors, such as L3, require the Federal Standard 595 paint chips used for inspection purposes be replaced every two years.

=== AMS-STD-595 ===
As of February 14, 2017, FED-STD-595 was cancelled and replaced by SAE International's AMS-STD-595. Color chips as well as fan decks are available, including a box set containing 692 color chips.

== See also ==
- Pantone
