= British ensign =

British maritime flag

British Ensigns
- Other names: Red Ensign, Red Duster
- Use: Civil ensign
- Proportion: 1:2
- Adopted: British Merchant Navy
- Design: A red field with the Union Flag in the canton
- Blue Ensign
- Use: State ensign
- Proportion: 1:2
- Adopted: HM Government
- Design: A blue field with the Union Flag in the canton
- White Ensign
- Use: Naval ensign
- Proportion: 1:2
- Adopted: The Royal Navy
- Design: A white field defaced with Saint George's Cross and the Union Flag in the canton
- RAF Ensign
- Proportion: 1:2
- Adopted: The Royal Air Force
- Design: A sky blue field with the Union Flag in the canton and the RAF Roundel in the fly

In British maritime law and custom, an ensign is the identifying flag flown to designate a British ship, either military or civilian. Such flags display the United Kingdom Union Jack in the canton (the upper corner next to the staff), with either a red, white, or blue field, dependent on whether the vessel is civilian, naval, or in a special category. These are known as the red, white, and blue ensigns respectively.

Outside the nautical sphere, ensigns are used to designate many other military units, government departments and administrative divisions. These flags are modelled on the red, white, and blue naval ensigns, but may use different colours for the field, and be defaced by the addition of a badge or symbol, for example the sky blue with concentric red, white and blue circles of the Royal Air Force ensign.

The Union Flag (also known as the Union Jack) should be flown as a jack by Royal Navy ships only when moored or at anchor. If flown while underway, the ship must be dressed for a special occasion or celebration with masthead ensigns, otherwise it signals that the monarch or an Admiral of the Fleet is on board. The Union Flag may also signal that a court martial is in progress.

The use of the Union Flag as an ensign on a civilian craft is still illegal, unless it has a white border, ever since Charles I ordered it be restricted to His Majesty's ships "upon pain of Our high displeasure" in the 17th century, mainly due to its unauthorised use by merchant mariners to avoid paying harbour duties by passing themselves off as royal vessels.

== Modern usage ==
British ensigns currently in use can be classified into five categories, in descending order of exclusivity:

- the White Ensign
- the Blue Ensign
- the Blue Ensign defaced
- the Red Ensign
- the Red Ensign defaced

The traditional order of seniority was red, white, and blue, with the red as the senior ensign.

== Red ==
The Red Ensign (red field with the Union Flag in the canton) defaced by a badge is flown by Trinity House and various organisations and yacht clubs. Merchant ships and private vessels registered in British territories and dependencies, and in several Commonwealth realms, fly the Red Ensign defaced by the badge of their territory.

The Red Ensign undefaced is for the use of all other British merchant navy ships and private craft. The Red Ensign is the correct flag to be worn as courtesy flag by foreign private vessels in United Kingdom waters. Merchant vessels from British overseas territories and Crown dependencies are entitled to red ensigns defaced with the badge of their territory.

== Blue ==
The Blue Ensign (dark blue field with the Union Flag in the canton) undefaced is worn by masters of vessels in possession of a warrant issued by the Director of Naval Reserves, and by the members of certain yacht clubs. Such warrants are issued to officers in the active or retired lists of the Royal Naval Reserve and the maritime reserve forces of other Commonwealth realms and territories. The master must be of the rank of lieutenant RN or above, and fishing vessels must be crewed by at least four other Royal Naval reservists or pensioners.

=== Defaced ===
British government departments use a variety of blue ensigns defaced in the fly with the department badge, and colonial governments use blue ensigns defaced with the colonial badge.

The Ensign of the Sea Cadet Corps is a blue ensign defaced by the SCC badge. Under the terms of a Memorandum of Understanding with the Ministry of Defence, officers of the Sea Cadet Corps hold their ranks as (SCC) RNR on a 'nominal honorific' basis, and are included on the Navy List as a courtesy (though they are not commissioned, but 'appointed' within the Corps).

Other defaced ensigns were used by vessels of the Port of London Authority, Mersey Docks and Harbour Board, the Humber Conservancy, the Custom House, the Board of Trade, Lloyd's of London, the Post Office, submarine cable laying ships, and other departments including War Office Ordnance. The flag of Australia and those of its states, the flag of New Zealand, as well as a number of overseas self-governing territories of the UK are defaced blue ensigns. Several yacht clubs are also entitled to fly blue ensigns defaced by their club badge.

== White ==
Today's White Ensign, as used by Royal Navy ships, incorporates the St George's Cross (St George's Ensign). British yachts owned by members of the Royal Yacht Squadron are authorised to apply for a permit to wear this ensign. Defaced White Ensigns include that of the British Antarctic Territory.

Since the reorganisation of the Royal Navy in 1864, use of the White Ensign (a red St George's Cross on a white field with the Union Flag in the canton) has been restricted to ships, boats, submarines and on-shore establishments of the Royal Navy. The Royal Yacht Squadron also fly the White Ensign by special dispensation.

== Other ensigns ==
The Royal Air Force Ensign.

The British Civil Air Ensign.

Ensign of the Air Training Corps.

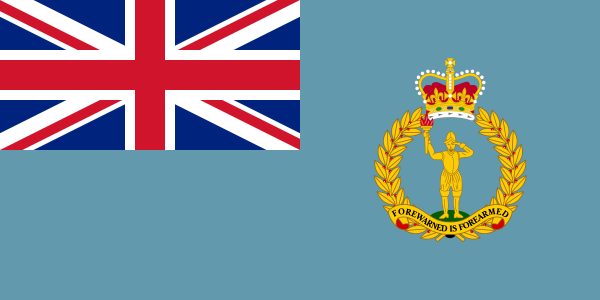
Ensign of the Royal Observer Corps.

Ensign of the Northern Lighthouse Board.

Commissioner's Ensign of the Northern Lighthouse Board.

Ensign of the Sea Cadet Corps.

Ensign of the Scottish Fisheries Protection Agency (1991–2009)

The flag of the British East India Company, like the Cambridge or Continental Union Flag of the American colonies, had a red and white striped field. There were similar red-and-white and green-and-white striped ensigns in the English Navy in the 16th century. Similarly in flag plates from the 17th and 18th centuries there are representations of the Guinea Jack of the Royal Africa Company in various forms; the jack consisted of St George's Cross within a double border of red and white chequers. The flag of Hawaii is a British ensign with a background of white, red and blue stripes.

Also in existence is a Royal Air Force (RAF) ensign and a civil air ensign, both of which have a sky-blue field, with the Union Flag in the canton. The RAF Ensign is defaced with the red-white-blue RAF roundel, while the field of the civil air ensign is charged with a large dark-blue cross fimbriated white. During World War II, the Belgian section of the RAF used a variant of RAF Ensign defaced with the black-yellow-red roundel. The flag of Tuvalu and that of Fiji are also defaced sky Blue Ensigns.

The White Ensign of the commissioner of the Northern Lighthouse Board is unique in that it remains one of the only examples of a pre-1801 Union Flag in official use today. This flag is flown only from vessels with commissioners aboard.

There are two "yellow" ensigns in use in the South Pacific, both featuring the Southern Cross. The personal flag of the governor of Victoria, Australia, has been the flag of Victoria with a yellow instead of a dark blue background. The flag of Niue, a self-governing dependency of New Zealand, is also a yellow ensign. More unusually, it is the Union Flag canton rather than the fly which is defaced with a modified Southern Cross.

There is some evidence of the existence of a Green Ensign in British Ireland, defaced with a gold Irish harp in the fly. It is not clear to what extent this unofficial ensign was ever in use by Irish merchant ships at the time.

The flag of the British Antarctic Territory has a white field defaced with the territory's badge, while the British Indian Ocean Territory flag has a white and blue wavy-striped field, also defaced.

Finally, there is one "orange" ensign, used by the Orange Order in Canada. This flag is an Orange Ensign defaced with a white shield, and a red maple leaf within it.

=== Cornish Ensign ===
Ensign of Cornwall

Ensign of Devon

Flag of Niue

The Cornish Ensign or St Piran's Ensign, is a Cornish flag with the Union Flag in the canton. This flag is used widely among Cornish mariners. Often flown by leisure craft and occasionally flown by Cornish merchant vessels.

=== Devon Ensign ===
First flown in 2003 the Devon Regatta Ensign adds a Union Flag into the canton of the Devon Flag – the flag is described as for use at regattas, high days and holidays, weddings and burials at sea.

This flag can also be referred to as the St Petroc's Ensign, due to its link with the saint. This flag is widely used among Devonian mariners. Often flown by leisure craft.

=== Golden Ensign ===
The Golden Ensign, also referred to as the Yellow Ensign, is only seen in one state or regional level flag, the flag of Niue, an island country under free-association with New Zealand, is a notable example using a Golden Ensign. The Golden Ensign can also be seen in the standard of the Governor of Victoria.

The flag of Niue is the most popular example of the Golden Ensign, reflecting the nations heritage to the British monarchy and the islands culture and history.

== Colours ==
The colours used in most British ensigns are the colours of the Union Flag; Union Jack (royal) blue, Union Flag red and white:

Scheme	Blue	Red	White
Pantone (paper)	280 C	186 C	Safe
HEX	#012169	#C8102E	#FFFFFF
MoD	8711D	8711	8711J
NSN	8305.99.130.4580	8305.99.130.4584	8305.99.130.4585
CMYK	100.85.5.22	2.100.85.6	0.0.0.0
RGB	1, 33, 105	200, 16, 46	255, 255, 255

All HEX, CMYK and RGB specifications for the Pantone colours are taken from the official Pantone website on the webpages of the corresponding colours. Although the colour schemes are official, not all of the colours are completely congruent. This is due to different specifications for different types of media (for example, screen and print).

== The Royal Hospital School ==
The Royal Hospital School is the only independent school in the United Kingdom to have been continuously awarded the "Queens Banner" and its own distinctive school ensign.

== History ==
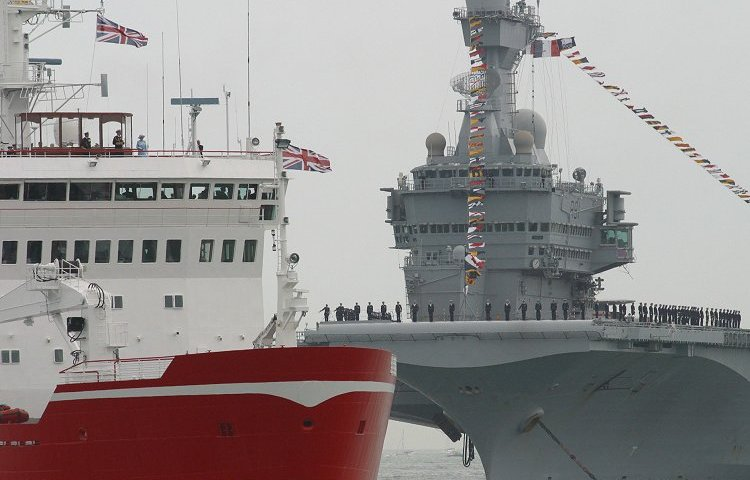
HMS Endurance passing the French aircraft carrier Charles de Gaulle, flying the Union Jack at the jackstaff and also at the masthead to signify the royal presence of Queen Elizabeth II, who can be seen on the bridge.

Prior to 1864, red, white, and blue were the colours of the three squadrons of the Royal Navy, which were created as a result of the reorganisation of the navy in 1652 by Admiral Robert Blake. Each squadron flew one of the three ensigns. In addition to the Admiral of the Fleet (who was Admiral of the Red), each squadron had its own admirals, vice admirals and rear admirals, e.g. Lord Nelson was Vice Admiral of the White at the time of his death.

The red squadron tended to patrol the Caribbean and north Atlantic, the white the coasts of Britain, France and the Mediterranean, while the blue patrolled the south Atlantic, Pacific and Indian oceans. The flags of the various former British colonies often have backgrounds of the same colour as their protective squadron. Hence Bermuda has a red ground and Australia and New Zealand blue. Canada's flag was a red ensign from founding until the adoption of the maple leaf flag in 1965.

The flag of the United States also follows this pattern; early flags of the American Revolution were modified Red Ensigns. The Continental Union Flag added six white stripes to the Red Ensign; this flag was used during the fight for independence until the Union Jack in the canton was replaced by the stars in 1777.

Reference was sometimes made to "the yellow squadron". This squadron did not actually exist but was a term used unofficially to describe those naval personnel who worked ashore or did not have a ship. Therefore, there was no 'Yellow ensign'.

== Canadian ensigns ==
In 1868, the British Admiralty made the Canadian Blue Ensign the proper flag for ships of the Canadian government, and in 1892, the Admiralty approved the use of the Canadian Red Ensign by Canadian merchant ships.

From about 1870, Canada unofficially used a Red Ensign with the arms of its provinces on one shield as its national flag (the Canadian Red Ensign). In 1924, an order-in-council made the flag official (for certain purposes) and replaced the provincial arms with the royal arms of Canada. The red ensign was replaced by the current red and white maple-leaf flag in 1965. In that same year, the provinces of Ontario and Manitoba adopted red ensigns defaced by their provincial arms as their provincial flags. (see Flag of Ontario and Flag of Manitoba)

== Gallery ==
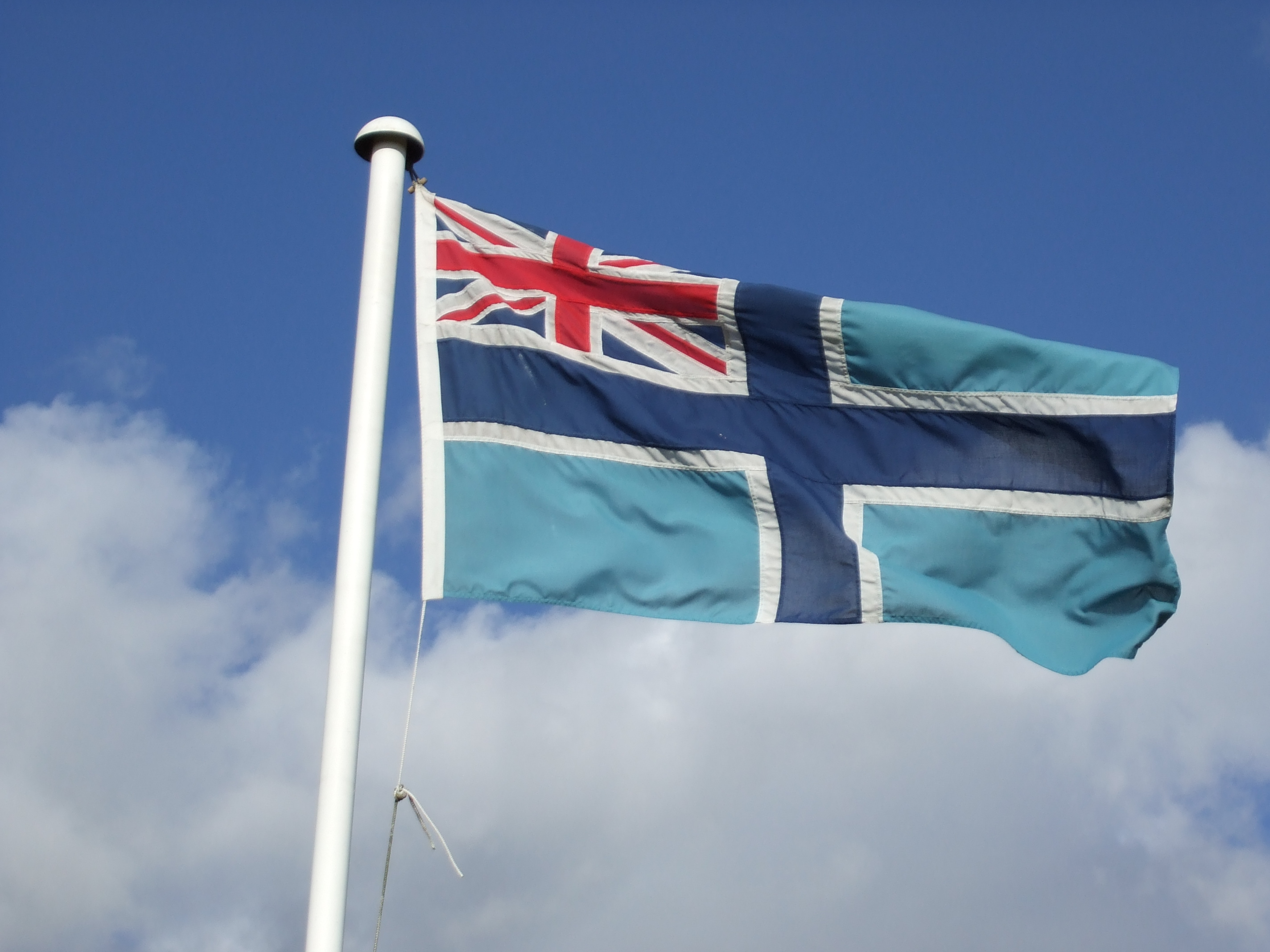
British Civil Air Ensign in use at Hunsdon Airfield.

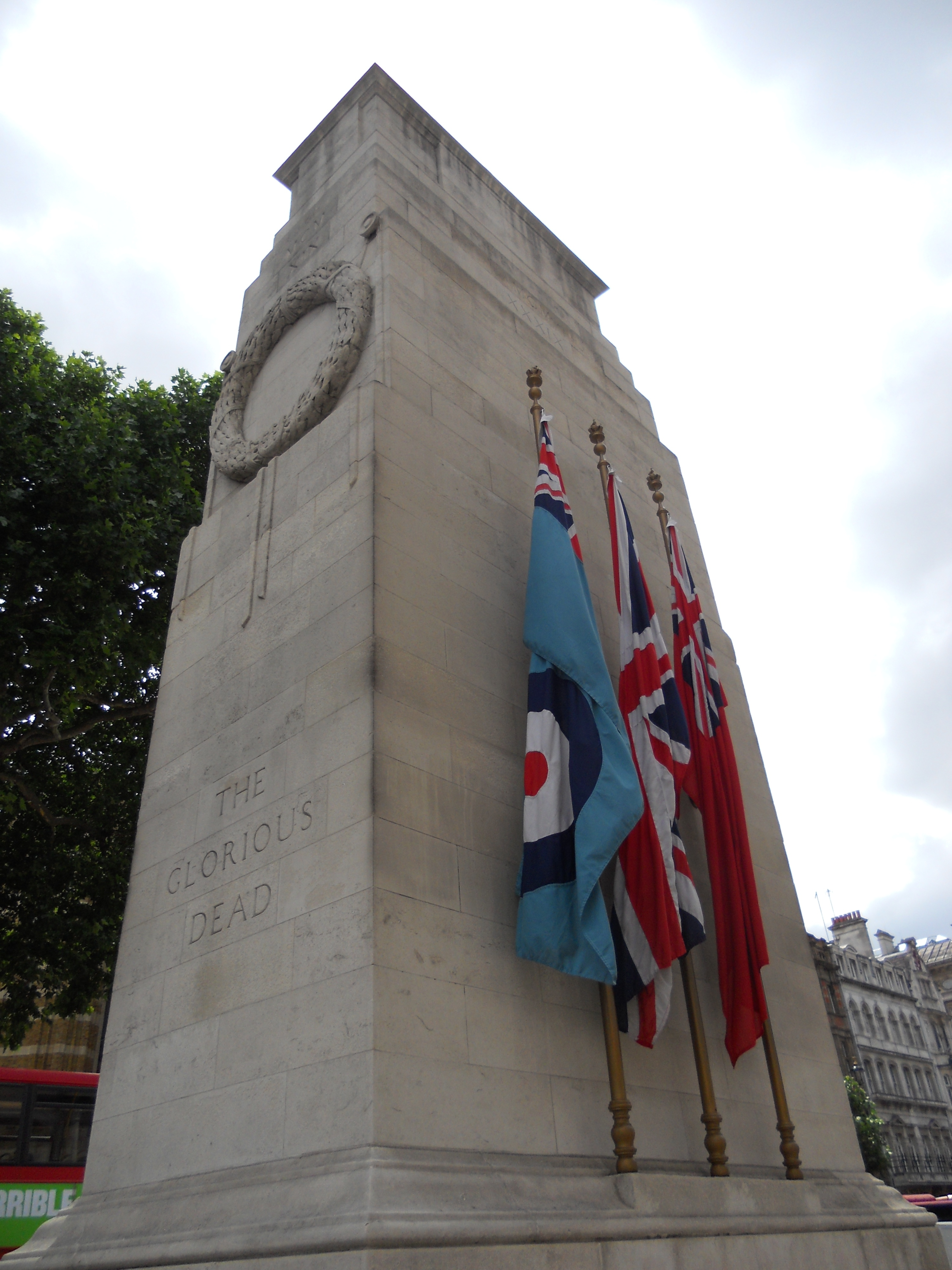
The Cenotaph, showing the Royal Air Force and Civil Ensign flanking the Union Jack.

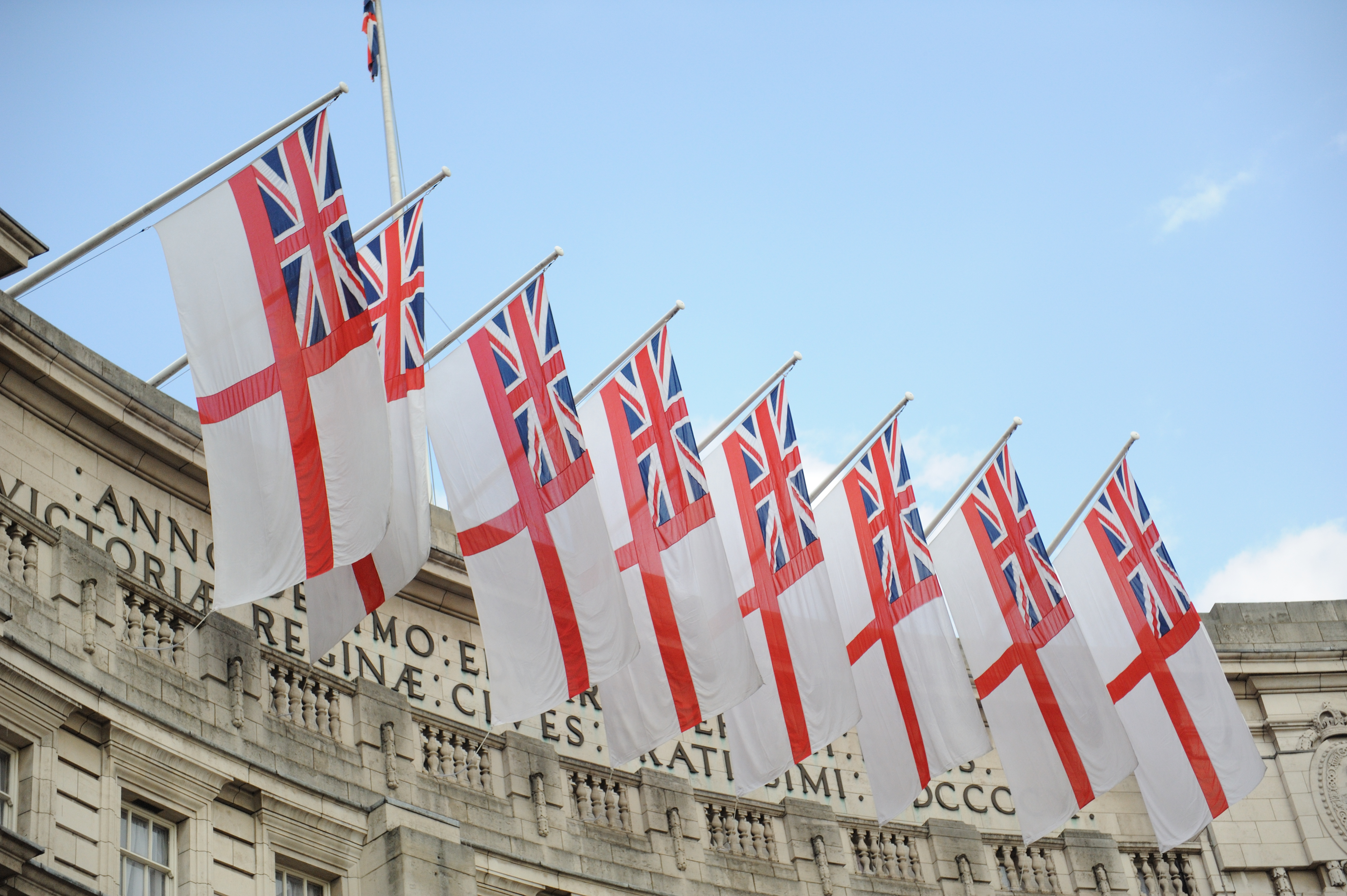
Admiralty Arch is customarily decorated with White Ensigns on state occasions.

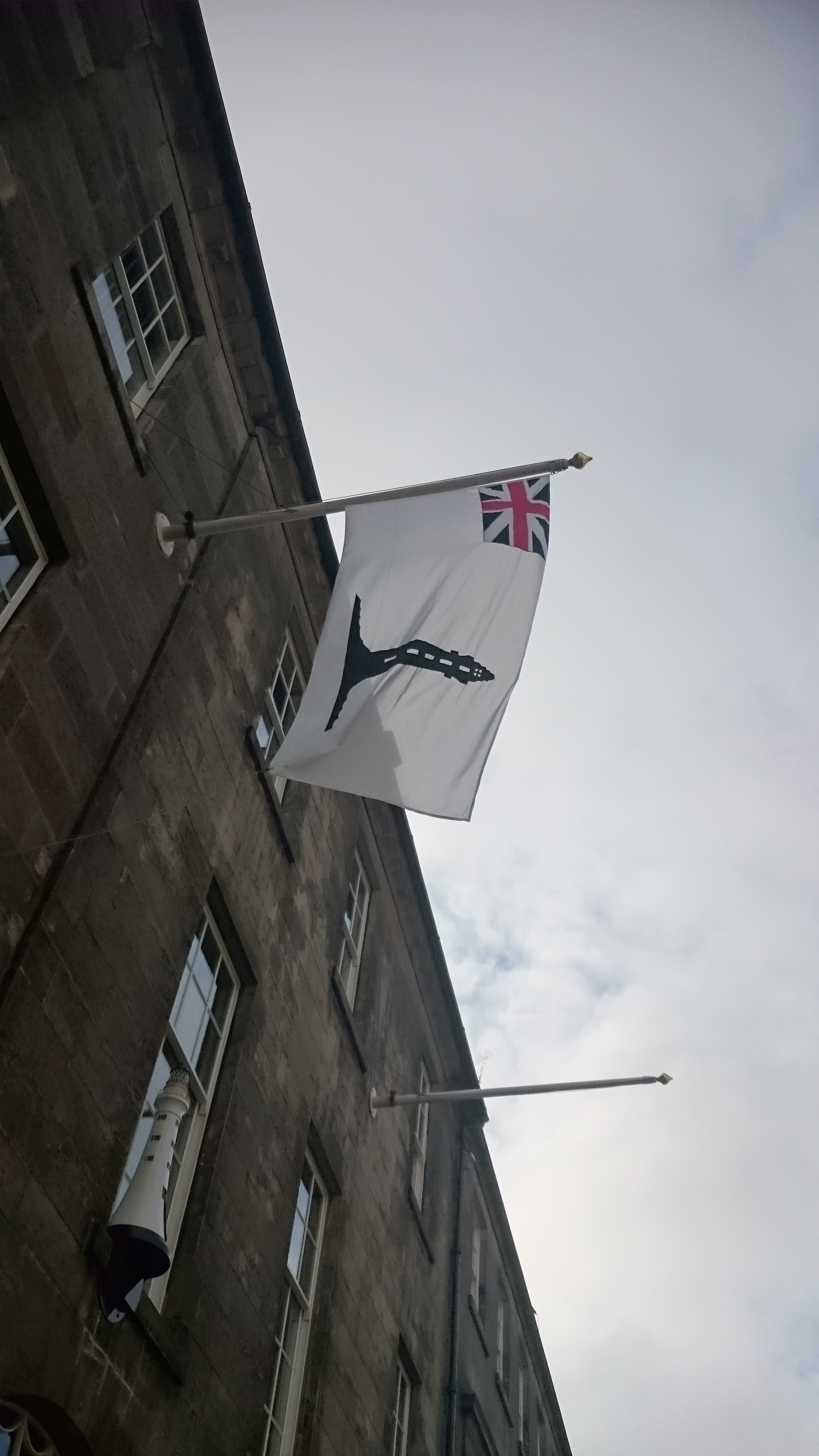
Commissioners' Flag, flown outside the Northern Lighthouse Board HQ in Edinburgh.

== See also ==
- Blue Ensign
- Red Ensign
- Green Ensign
- Historical flags of the British Empire and the overseas territories
- Continental Union Flag
- Lists of flags
- Maritime flag
- Jack (flag)
- Union Jack
- Flags based on British ensigns
- Flag of Australia
- Flag of Canada
- Flag of New Zealand
- Flag of Tuvalu
- List of Canadian provincial and territorial symbols

== Sources ==
- Flags and flag etiquette. In Fowler, Jean (Ed.): Reed's Nautical Almanac 1992, pp. 13:1–13:8. East Molesey: Thomas Reed Publications. ISBN 0-947637-96-6
