= Ensign (flag) =

Maritime flag used for national identification of ships

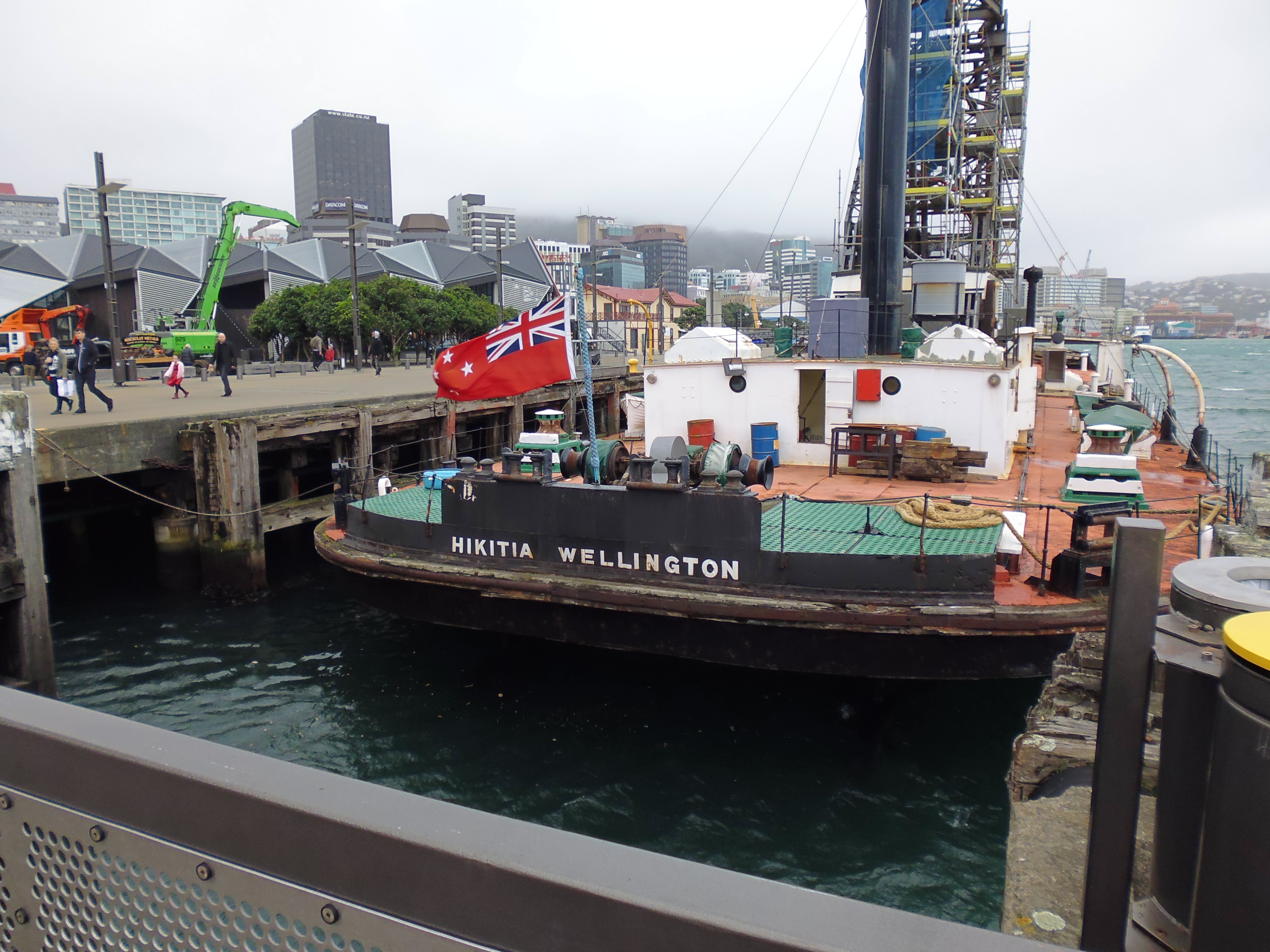
National civil ensign of New Zealand flown from the stern of Hikitia

An ensign is a maritime flag that is used for the national identification of a ship. It is the largest flag and is generally flown at the stern (rear) of the ship while in port. Depending on the ship's origin, it may sometimes be identical with a jack on the bow of the ship when in a port. Jacks are more common on warships than on merchant ships.

== Etymology ==
The Middle English ensign is derived from the Latin word insignia.

== Vexillology ==
Vexillologists distinguish between three varieties of ensigns:

- A state ensign or government ensign (usage symbol) is worn by government vessels of official government agencies or civilian equipped auxiliary ships.
- A naval ensign (usage symbol) is worn by a country's navy as a war flag for military ships. The term "war flag" is used irrespective of if a given country is at war. Large versions of naval ensigns called battle ensigns are used when a warship goes into battle. The ensign differs from the jack, which is additionally flown from a jackstaff at the bow of a vessel if they are at the port.
- A civil ensign (usage symbol) is worn by merchant and pleasure vessels. The merchant maritime flag or civil ensign is, therefore, the specific flag for the merchant navy of a country, unless the (private) owners are authorized to use another. The commercial flag was created to allow these private individuals to declare their nationality. Some countries have a specific yacht ensign for recreational boats without declared cargo, which differs from the regular ensign. Merchant flags can only be flown by ships that are not ships of war, ships of state, auxiliary ships or yachts. These ships do not represent an extraterritorial area, but rather belong to a private person or similar and thus do not represent the state itself. This means that the use of the national or even state flag is normally forbidden.

Some countries like the United States and France use just one flag as an ensign and also as a jack, while lacking special cantons and transparent identification. All ships of the seagoing services of the United States Government except for the United States Coast Guard fly the national flag as their ensign, although the ships of some agencies also fly an agency flag as a distinctive mark.

Countries like Ukraine, Italy, Russia, South Africa, Australia, New Zealand and Japan use different ensigns. These are strictly regulated and indicate if the vessel is a warship, a merchant ship, a ship under contract to carry mail, or a yacht, for example.

The national flags of several Commonwealth countries originated in the ensigns of the United Kingdom. Some of these national flags include those of Australia, New Zealand and several island nations. It is also very likely that the Continental Union Flag, from which the flag of the United States developed, was strongly influenced by either the British Red Ensign or the flag of the British East India Company.

== Usage ==
In nautical use, every boat uses a flag belonging to a specific nation to indicate its organizational membership. This flag signifies the home port of the ship owner and that taxes for ship-related income are paid there. Flagging out always means that the relevant laws of the country apply on the ship. This includes employment contracts, safety regulations, stamp duty or value-added taxes.

In most countries, especially in Europe and the countries of the Commonwealth of Nations, it is common for the ensign to display additional information, like whether it is a civil, state or military flag.

Ensigns are usually at the stern flagstaff when in port, and may be shifted to a gaff (if available) or mast amidships when the ship is under way, becoming known as a steaming ensign.

A boat flag is also often used as guest country flag and is flown on the boat when navigating in foreign waters or entering another country's port.

== Air ensigns ==
With the creation of independent air forces and the growth in civil aviation in the first half of the 20th century, a range of distinguishing flags and ensigns were adopted. These may be divided into air force ensigns (often light blue in color, such as the Royal Air Force Ensign) and civil air ensigns.

== Heraldic ensigns ==
In heraldry, an ensign is an ornament or sign, such as the crown, coronet, or mitre, borne above the charge or arms.

== Gallery ==
The White Ensign as currently used by Royal Navy vessels

The Blue Ensign as currently used for British government vessels

The Red Ensign as currently used for British civilian vessels

Government Ensign of Gibraltar

Civil Ensign of Gibraltar

Royal Air Force Ensign used by the Royal Air Force

Royal Australian Air Force Ensign

Royal New Zealand Air Force Ensign

Royal Canadian Air Force Ensign

Royal Australian Navy Ensign

Royal New Zealand Navy Ensign

Canadian Naval Ensign

The Civil Air Ensign as currently used by UK civil aviation establishments

Australian Civil Aviation Ensign

New Zealand Civil Air Ensign

Australian national Flag and State Ensign

Australian Red Ensign

New Zealand national flag (Māori: Te haki o Aotearoa) and State Ensign

New Zealand Red Ensign

Indian Navy Ensign

Indian Civil Ensign

Civil and Naval ensign of Albania

Belgian Navy Ensign

Ensign of the Royal Danish Navy

Egyptian Navy Ensign

Finnish yacht club ensign. The circled X represents the club emblem

Civil and Naval Ensign of France

Bundesmarine Ensign

Naval Ensign of Italy

Naval ensign of the Imperial Japanese Navy and the Japan Maritime Self-Defense Force

Luxembourg Civil Ensign

Myanmar Navy Ensign

Royal Netherlands Navy Reserve ensign

Nigerian Navy ensign

North Korean Navy Ensign

Ensign of the Royal Norwegian Navy

Polish Navy Ensign

Russian Navy Ensign

Naval Ensign of the Royal Saudi Navy

Spanish yacht ensign

Naval ensign of Sri Lanka

Naval ensign of Royal Thai Navy

Ukrainian Navy Ensign

United States Coast Guard ensign

Naval ensign of Vietnam

== See also ==
- Distinctive mark
- Maritime flag
- Jack
