= Royal Ordnance =

British weapons manufacturer

Royal Ordnance Plc
- Company type: Private
- Industry: Defence
- Founded: 1984 (as Royal Ordnance)
- Headquarters: Farnborough, England
- Products: Armaments
- Parent: BAE Systems

Royal Ordnance plc was formed on 2 January 1985 as a public corporation, owning the majority of what until then were the remaining United Kingdom government-owned Royal Ordnance Factories (abbreviated ROFs) which manufactured explosives, ammunition, small arms including the Lee–Enfield rifle, guns and military vehicles such as tanks. It owned some 16 factories; and employed about 19,000 staff.

Royal Ordnance plc was bought by British Aerospace (BAe) in April 1987, which became BAE Systems in 1999. The name Royal Ordnance was retained for almost another twenty years; and the sites retained their former names, either as Royal Ordnance or later RO Defence sites. The Royal Ordnance name was dropped in 2004 and after having traded as Land Systems, the division is now known as Land UK.

== History ==
=== Royal Ordnance Factories ===
The Royal Ordnance Factories (ROFs) can trace their history back to 1560 with the founding of the Royal Gunpowder Factory (RGPF) at Waltham Abbey, Essex. This was linked to the Royal Small Arms Factory (RSAF) at Enfield Lock and the Royal Arsenal at Woolwich. All three were based near London— but not too close in case of explosion. The title of Royal Arsenal was introduced in 1805 to encompass the Royal Laboratories, Royal Gun Factory, and the Royal Carriage, which were originally separate and based in Greenwich.

In 1927 these three Royal Factories were transferred, within the War Office, from the Ministry of Munitions to the Department of the Master-General of the Ordnance. As World War II loomed, a further 40 ROFs were built by the Ministry of Supply, from the late 1930s into the 1940s, employed around 300,000 personnel. The number of factory sites and personnel employed shrank considerably after the end of the Second World War.

As part of its privatisation process in the 1980s, the UK Government transferred some of the, formerly separate, research and development capability of the Defence Research Establishments into the ROFs. Other parts of the UK's defence research and design capability were later closed down; remained with the UK Ministry of Defence, later to become Dstl; or became part of the privatised QinetiQ. The small number of ROFs involved in nuclear weapons production, ROF Burghfield and ROF Cardiff, were removed from ROF management and did not pass over to Royal Ordnance upon privatisation. They were transferred to the control of AWRE; which later became the Atomic Weapons Establishment.

=== Privatisation ===
On 2 January 1985, vesting day, the twelve ROFs that still remained open, plus the Waltham Abbey South site, RSAF Enfield and three agency factories, became a UK government-owned company: Royal Ordnance plc. Its headquarters was moved to ROF Chorley, Lancashire; with its registered office located in central London. The intention of the government at this stage was to privatise Royal Ordnance as soon as possible through a stock market flotation.

In mid-1985 a target date of July 1986 was set; however, by June 1986 the government announced that flotation would not be possible and that it intended to sell the company privately. The following problems were identified as barriers to a flotation:

- The future of ROF Leeds, notably the uncertain future due to over-capacity in UK main battle tank production.
- The future relationship between the MOD and the company.
- The financial position of the company.
- Liabilities regarding a contract with British Aerospace

The problems associated with ROF Leeds were solved when Royal Ordnance agreed the sale of the factory and intellectual property rights of the Challenger tanks to Vickers plc on 4 October 1986, the final agreement was signed on 31 March 1987 valuing ROF Leeds at £15.2 million. Vickers became Alvis Vickers and, in 2004, became part of BAE Systems, and the Leeds factory was closed. The relationship with the MOD was resolved by certain guarantees given to the company by the MOD regarding future procurement strategies. The financial position of the company was resolved by a Treasury cash injection and the proceeds of the ROF Leeds sale. The liabilities were with regard to a sub-contract for a missile systems between British Aerospace (BAe) and an MOD research establishment transferred to Royal Ordnance on Incorporation; BAe and the MOD reached agreement in February 1987.

Bids for Royal Ordnance plc were invited in October 1986, resulting in six offers. These were eventually reduced to two; one from British Aerospace and one from Guest, Keen & Nettlefolds (GKN). The £188.5 million GBP BAe offer was accepted, and the sale was completed on 22 April 1987.

== Rationalisation ==
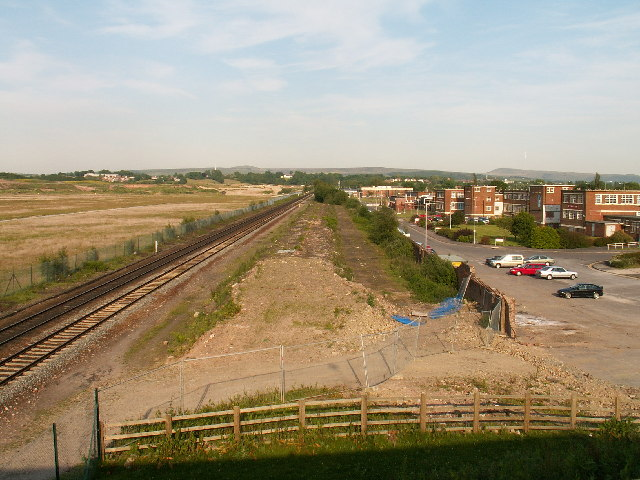
View of the cleared ROF Chorley site. The explosive filling site was to the right of the railway; the area between the railway and the hedge was the site of ROF Chorley Halt; and to the right of the hedge is the former Headquarters building for ROF Chorley.

At the time of the sale, RO Defence had 16 factories; and some 19,000 personnel were employed. Shortly after privatisation, it has closed and sold its sites at ROF Patricroft, RSAF Enfield and Waltham Abbey South.

In April 1992 BAe / RO Defence bought BMARC and Poudreries Réunies de Belgique (PRB) from the receivers of the failed Astra Holdings; and later Muiden Chemie. In 1991 RO Defence also bought the small arms ammunition interests of Heckler & Koch.

In 2000 the headquarters of Royal Ordnance was moved from RO Chorley to BAE Systems' Filton site, and manufacturing ceased at RO Bishopton.

== Consolidation into BAE Systems ==
In 1999 BAe merged with Marconi Electronic Systems, the defence interests of GEC, at the same time changing its name from British Aerospace to BAE Systems. The Royal Ordnance sites were from then onwards treated as BAE Systems owned sites with Royal Ordnance regarded as business units operating from the sites. In 2002 Heckler & Koch was sold to Heckler and Koch Beteiligungs GmbH.

In 2004 BAE Systems acquired Alvis Vickers Ltd, which was merged with the RO Defence business and ex-GEC plants at Barrow-in-Furness and Leicester to form BAE Systems Land Systems. This organisation was further expanded in 2005 when BAE Systems took over the US company United Defense Industries and added it to the Land Systems business group to create BAE Systems Land and Armaments. These two mergers and expansions meant that the former Royal Ordnance sites were renamed as BAE Systems Land and Armaments.

== See also ==
- List of Royal Ordnance Factories
- Sterling Armaments Company
