= Civil air ensign =

Flag representing civil aviation

A civil air ensign is a flag (or a variation thereof) which represents civil aviation in a country or organization. Typically, it is flown from buildings connected with the administration of civil aviation and it may also be flown by airlines of the appropriate country. A civil air ensign is the equivalent of the civil ensign which represents merchant shipping. Not all countries have civil air ensigns and those without usually fly their national flags instead.

== List of civil air ensigns ==
=== Countries ===
Flag	Country	Date	Name	Description
	Australia	1948–present	Australian Civil Aviation Ensign	An ensign based on the British Civil Air Ensign with the Commonwealth Star and the five stars of the Southern Cross superimposed.
	Fiji	1970–present	Fijian Civil Air Ensign	An ensign based on the British Civil Air Ensign with the Fijian coat of arms superimposed.
	Ghana	1957–present	Ghanaian Civil Air Ensign	A light blue ensign with the Flag of Ghana in the canton and the national star in the fly.
	Guyana	1966–present	Guyanese Civil Air Ensign	An ensign based on the British Civil Air Ensign with the Flag of Guyana in the canton.
	Luxembourg	1972–present	Roude Léiw	An ensign as the banner of arms of Luxembourg. Also used as the Luxembourgish civil ensign.
	New Zealand	1938–present	New Zealand Civil Air Ensign	An ensign based on the British Civil Air Ensign with the stars of the Southern Cross as seen from New Zealand in the fourth quarter
	Pakistan	1951–present	Pakistan Civil Air Ensign	A light blue ensign with the Flag of Pakistan in the canton influenced by the British design.
	United Kingdom	1931–present	British Civil Air Ensign	A light blue ensign with the Union Flag in the canton and a dark blue Saint George's cross fimbriated white placed overall.
	Zambia	1965–present	Zambian Civil Air Ensign	On a field of sky blue an alighting eagle gold set within a ring quartered in the colours of the Republic of Zambia thus. In the first quarter green, on the hoist side orange, in the fly side red and in the base black.

=== Organizations ===
Flag	Entity	Date	Name	Description
	International Civil Aviation Organization	1993–present	International Civil Aviation Organization flag	A flag bearing the ICAO emblem similar in size, colour and general layout as the United Nations flag.

== List of former civil air ensigns ==
Flag	Country	Date	Name	Description
	Australia	1935–1948	Australian Civil Aviation Ensign	An ensign based on the British Civil Air Ensign with the Commonwealth Star quarter and the five stars of the Southern Cross superimposed in gold.
	Canada	1922–1923	Canadian Civil Aviation Ensign	Light blue, in the dexter canton the Union and in the centre of the fly of the flag on a red shield edged with white, an albatross, white, with wings extended over three maple leaves conjoined on one stem, proper. Briefly used by the Air Board.
	Ghana	1964–1966	Ghanaian Civil Air Ensign	A light blue ensign with the Flag of Ghana in the canton and the national star in the fly.
	Greece	1935–1978	Greek Civil Air Ensign	A white cross on a blue field with a Greek roundel in the centre. Also used as the ensign of the Hellenic Air Force (1973–1978).
	South Africa	1930s	South African Civil Air Ensign	An ensign based on the British Civil Air Ensign with the 1928 flag of South Africa in the canton.
	Soviet Union	1961–1991	Flag of the Aeroflot	
