= New Zealand Civil Air Ensign =

Civil aviation flag for New Zealand

The New Zealand Civil Air Ensign is the flag that represents civil aviation in New Zealand.

The ensign consists of a dark blue Latin cross edged with white on a light blue field. A Union Jack is placed in the first quarter and the Southern Cross, as seen from New Zealand, are shown in red in the lower half of the fly. The ensign is based on the British Civil Air Ensign and the national flag of New Zealand.

== Institution ==
The original design for the ensign was submitted to King George VI by the Governor-General of New Zealand, Lord Galway.

On 16 November 1938, by an exercise of the Royal prerogative, the New Zealand Civil Air Ensign was instituted. Thereafter it was "recognised as the proper national colours to be flown by British aircraft registered in New Zealand".

== Use ==
The ensign may be flown at aerodromes in New Zealand, on any New Zealand aircraft and from the principal offices of airlines which own New Zealand aircraft. Additionally, the Civil Aviation Authority of New Zealand may fly the ensign from its buildings or aircraft.
