= Australian civil air ensign =

Civil aviation flag of Australia

Australian civil air ensign

Flag used in 1935–1948

The Australian civil air ensign is an Australian flag that is used by Airservices Australia.

The design of the flag is based on the British civil air ensign, which is divided into quarters by a dark blue cross with a white fimbriation. There is a Union Jack in the upper hoist quarter, and the other quarters light blue. When an Australian version was first adopted in 1935, it included the stars from the Australian national flag in yellow, and with the Southern Cross rotated by roughly 45 degrees, meaning that the smallest star was completely inside the arm of the blue cross. In 1948, the colour of the stars was changed to white to improve the flag's recognition when viewed from a long distance.

Originally, civil air ensigns were intended to be flown at airports and by civilian aircraft on the ground. While the practice of flying flags from landed aircraft has not commonly continued, this flag has been used by agencies such as the Civil Aviation Authority and is still used by the Minister for Transport. On 21 April 2009, the Civil Aviation Safety Authority granted the Australian Air League official use of the Australian civil air ensign to recognise the organisation's significant contribution to aviation in Australia.
