= Australian Air League =

- Founded: September 1933
- Type: Youth Organisation
- Purpose: Aviation Training and Youth Development
- Headquarters: Balwyn North, Victoria
- Region served: New South Wales, Queensland, South Australia, Victoria, Australian Capital Territory
- Chairman: Brendan McCormick
- Chief Comr.: Ian Rickards, OAM
- Revenue: ▲$358,989 AUD (FY24-25)
- Website: www.airleague.com.au

The Australian Air League (AAL) is a not-for-profit, civilian operated aviation organisation in Australia. Its objective is to encourage the spirit of aviation and air-mindedness in the youth of Australia. The Australian Air League receives no money or assistance of any government department and is entirely self-funded. Its Latin motto is A Vinculo Terrae (Free From the Bonds of The Earth). The official patron of the Australian Air League is aviation journalist Jeff Watson.

The Australian Air League has active squadrons in New South Wales, Queensland, South Australia, Victoria and the Australian Capital Territory. The AAL does not operate in the Northern Territory, Tasmania, or Western Australia.

== History ==
The Australian Air League uses the Australian Civil Aviation Ensign

Mr. George Robey was an Australian soldier who distinguished himself as an original ANZAC. He was awarded a Distinguished Conduct Medal on 25 April 1915 at the Gallipoli landing. Mr. Robey was still a soldier, in the Citizen Military Forces when in 1927 he went to Canberra to assist in the Ceremonial Opening of Parliament House.

He brought back a toy wooden aeroplane for his son Keith that sparked an interest in aviation that inspired his son and that inspiration has lasted until the present day.

Keith Robey through his career has been a senior executive of one of Australia's largest general aviation companies. Keith has also been known as a well-respected aviation feature writer for Aircraft magazine, specialising in flight testing of aircraft.

The gift of the toy wooden aeroplane also sparked off the Australian Air League when five years later Keith complained of the lack of a youth organisation specialising in aviation.

His father George Robey and other concerned adults formed the Air-Mind Development League of Australia, shortly changing the name to Australian Air League and on 18 July 1934 Keith became enrolled as the first Cadet member.

The first training Squadron opened on Sydney's Northern Beaches at Manly on 17 January 1935 with 30 Cadets aged between 14 and 23 years. The first girls Squadron opened in 1945. The Correspondence Wing commenced in 1941. By 1942, 26,000 boys had been trained in aviation and 125 Squadrons operated in three states.

World War II took its toll as many of the Officers went into the services and at the end of hostilities, felt that they had experienced more than enough of wearing uniforms and discipline and hence many Squadrons closed.

However, the Australian Air League has continued with 41 active Squadrons across Australia in 2025. The founders of the Australian Air League saw the prosperous future for aviation and the Australian Air League has become part of that future being recognised in the aviation industry and Armed Services as the primary school of aviation. Over the years it has been held in high respect by the leaders of the Nation and from early stages of our history, Governors General of Australia have been Patron-In-Chief of the Australian Air League.

On 21 April 2009, the Civil Aviation Safety Authority granted the Australian Air League official use of the Australian Civil Aviation Ensign to recognise the organisation's significant contribution to aviation in Australia. The Australian Air League paraded and flew the flag at the organisation's 75th Anniversary Review at Parramatta Stadium in Sydney on 26 September 2009. It is the first time the honour of flying the flag has ever been granted to any other organisation outside of the Civil Aviation Safety Authority's jurisdiction.

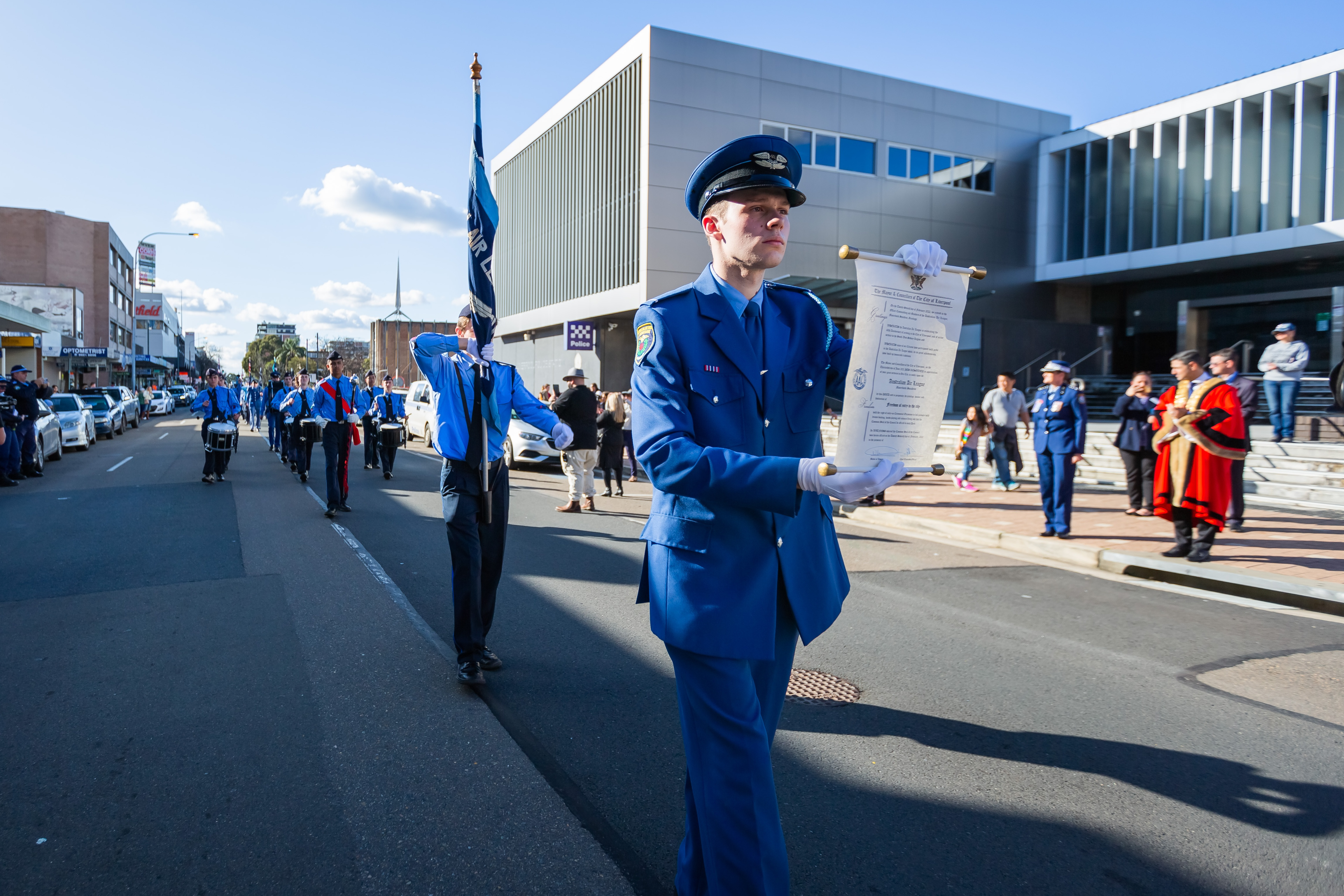
An officer of the Australian Air League marching past Liverpool Court House following the formal challenge from NSW Police Chief Inspector Allyson Fenwick.

The Australian Air League has also been twice honoured with Freedom of Entry, in 1994 and 2022 respectively. The City of Sydney granted the Freedom of Entry in October 1994 upon the whole organisation as a mark of the close relationship with the City and marking the League's 60th anniversary. The City of Liverpool granted Freedom of Entry in July 2022 upon Moorebank Squadron marking 60 years in the Liverpool community and included a formation flypast of aircraft from the League's NSW Air Activities Centre.

Today the Australian Air League Inc. is an independent organisation and is not associated with, or sponsored by, any religious, military or other organisation. It is completely self-governing and self-supporting.

== Structure of the League ==
=== Cadet ===
The term "Cadet" refers to a member who is under the age of 18 and/or holds one of the NCO ranks. Upon turning the age of 16 a Cadet becomes a Senior Cadet and wears dark blue epaulettes.

=== Section ===
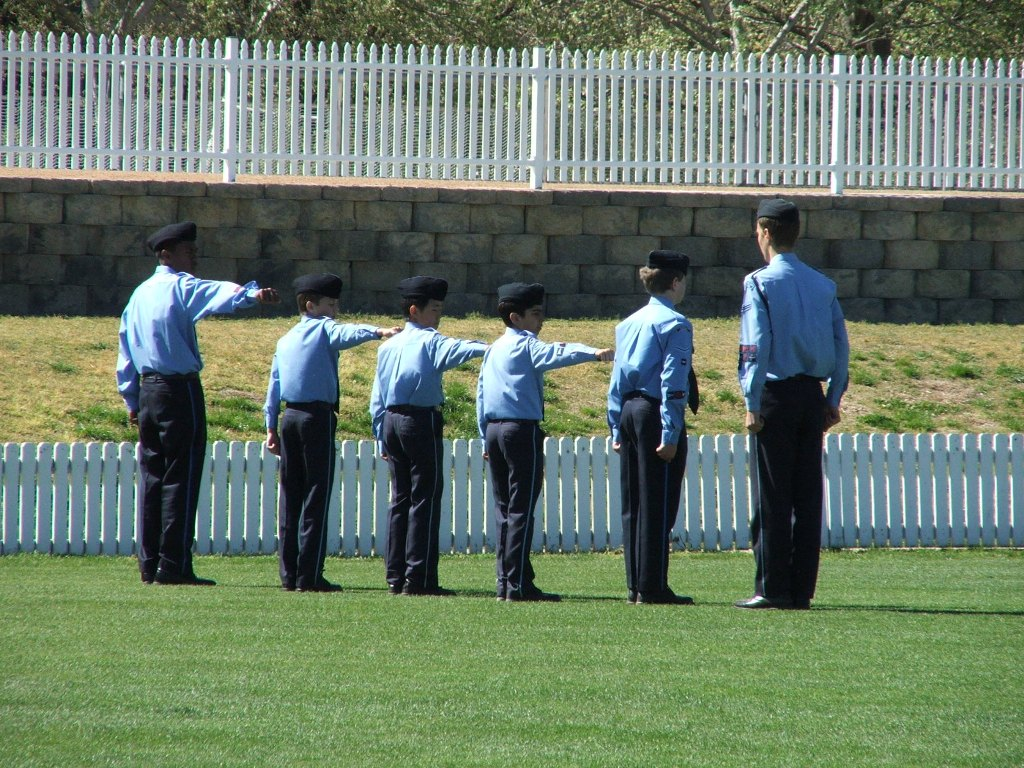
An example of a Cadet Section.

A Section is defined as a group of five Cadets, three of whom may be Leading Cadets, with a Corporal in charge of the Section for a total of six members. If the Section contains all three Leading Cadets, they comprise the first three members on the Corporal's left when forming up.

=== Flight ===
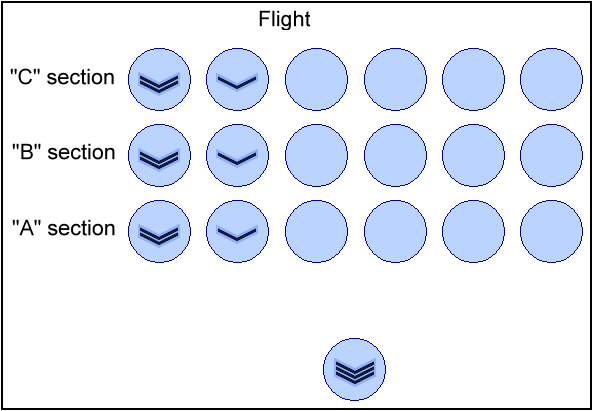
Diagram of the structure of a flight.

A Flight consists of 3 Sections in formation under the command of a Sergeant, making a total of 19 members.

When assembled as a Flight, each horizontal line of 6 cadets is known as a "rank". The 3 "ranks" are referred to as 'A', 'B' and 'C' sections, with 'A' section forming the front rank, 'B' section in the middle rank, and 'C' section at the rear. Each vertical line of cadets is known as a file. Each file is associated a number. (1 through 6 numbered from Sergeant's left)

=== Flag Party ===
A Flag Party is ceremonial unit paraded by Squadrons, Wings, Groups and Federal. Within a Squadron it can take 2 forms: 1 - 1 NCO in Charge, 3 bearers and 3 escorts; 2 - 1 NCO in Charge, 1 bearer and 2 escorts.

The first version consists of three flags, the State, National and Squadron flag. The second version may only consist of the Squadron or unit flag.

Wing, Group and Federal Flag Parties may only take the second form using their respective flag.

The ranks of the members in a Squadron Flag party must satisfy the following criteria:

- The N.C.O. in charge may hold a rank of no higher than Sergeant, but must out-rank every other member of the Flag Party.
- The flag-bearers are charged with the duty of carrying the Squadron, State and National flags. These members may hold a rank no higher than Corporal, but must equal or outrank the escorts.
- The escorts role is to assist the flag bearer and to "escort" the flags. These members may hold a rank no higher than Leading Cadet, but be of equal or lesser rank than the flag bearers

=== Band ===
Several Squadrons, Wings and Groups throughout the Australian Air League also have marching bands, made up of Cadets and Officers with an NCO in charge who is the Drum Major. The Drum Major is equivalent in rank to a Sergeant, although whilst in the band they are in charge of all personnel, including Officers.

Air League bands are typically composed of either a Drum Corps, or a Drum & Bugle Corps and can vary in size from 9 personnel up to a full band of 24 personnel. Air League bands compete in competitions as well as provide music during parades, both for the Air League as well as outside events such as ANZAC Day, Reserve Forces Day, Community Festivals and other promotional work for the Air League.

=== Squadron ===
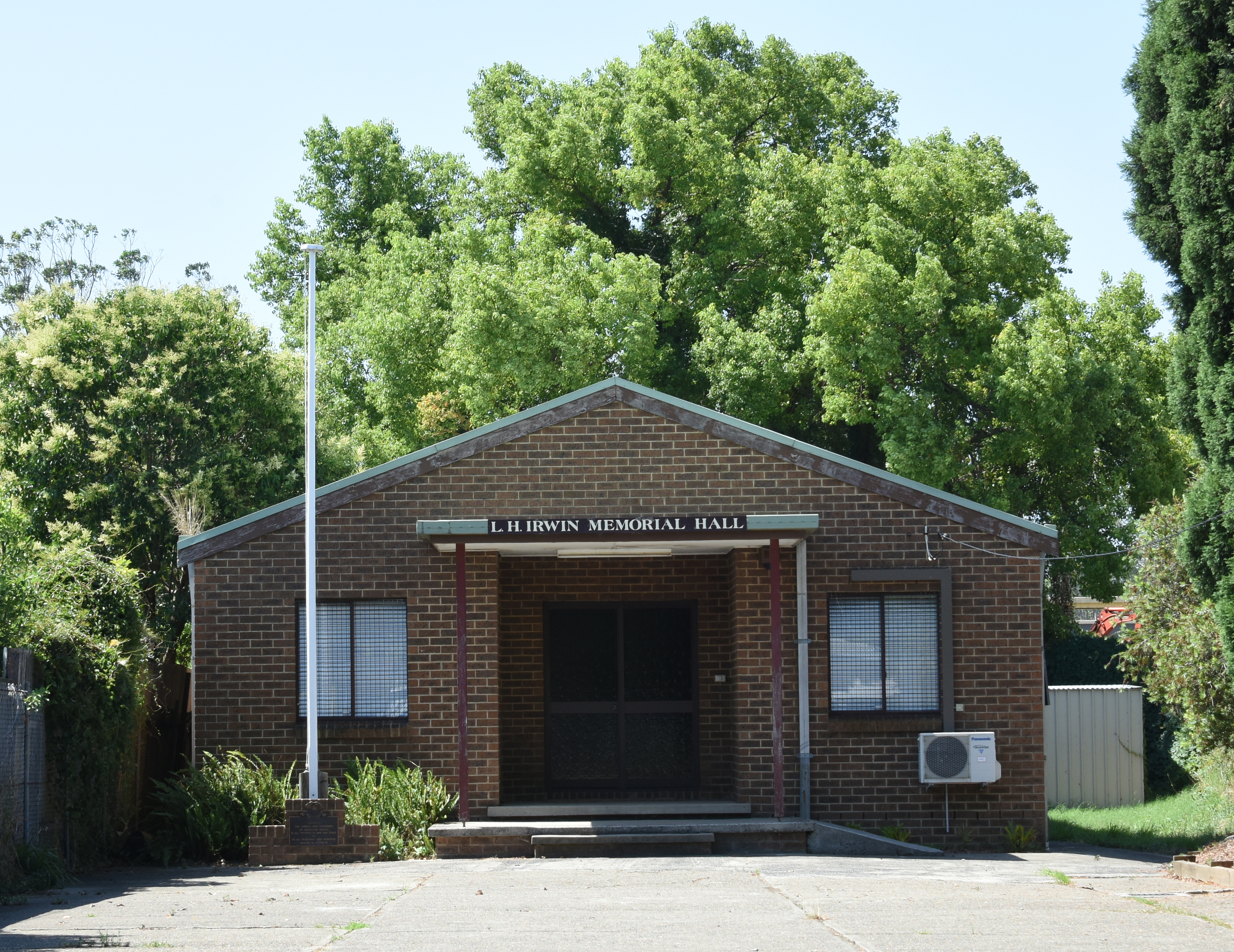
City of Blacktown squadron hall, units across the country typically meet in clubhouses just like this on a weekly basis.

A full Squadron consists of any number of Flights and a Flag Party with a Squadron Sergeant being in charge of all the cadet members present. Rather than directly ordering each unit, the Squadron Sergeant conveys orders to the N.C.O.s in charge of each sub-unit, who then relay the orders to their subordinates.

The Squadron also has a number of non-command Officers who are referred to as the Squadron Staff. The command level officer of the Squadron is the "Officer Commanding Squadron", usually abbreviated to S.O.C., or just O.C. when used in a Squadron environment.

=== Wing ===
A Wing consists of at least 2 Squadrons, who usually share a common geographical location. Similar to a Squadron, non-command Officers who work within the Wing are referred to as Wing Staff. The command level officer of this unit is the "Officer Commanding Wing" who is responsible for ensuring all Squadrons are operating efficiently.

=== Region ===
A Group may create a region which consists of at least 2 wings that usually share a larger geographical area if required - for example, "Eastern Region". The command level Officer in charge of the Region is the “Regional Commissioner/Officer”.

=== Group ===
A Group coordinates the League's activities at a State level and consists of all the Squadrons and Wings in their particular state. Group Status is defined by the League's Chief Commissioner, according to set criteria. Units in states that do not conform to these criteria are designated Wings of the Federal Unit. The commanding officer of this unit is the "Group Executive Commissioner" who is responsible for the operations of their respective Group. Non-command Officers who are in the Group are referred to as Group staff.

At present, the following groups currently exist within the League:

- Victoria Group
- Queensland Group
- New South Wales Group
- South Australia Group
- There is also a squadron in Canberra but it is part of the NSW Group.

=== Air Activities Centres ===
Air Activities Centres are establishments owned and operated by the AAL that conducts either Air Transport Operations, Flight training, aircraft maintenance or any other operations requiring regulatory approval in relation to the provision of aviation goods and services. While owned by the AAL, Air Activities Centres will usually be managed by the Group in which their location is based. The Centres are made up of key personnel as required by appropriate legislation and regulations, with the commanding officer called “Officer Commanding Flying/Gliding Centre”.

=== Federal ===
Federal Staff are responsible for ensuring the day-to-day running of their appointments and ensuring that all Groups (or Wings if the state have yet to be given 'Group' status) are operating efficiently and to the aims and objects of the League. The commanding officer of this unit is the "Chief Commissioner" who is the senior Officer of the League and who reports to the Council of the League.

=== Council of the League ===
The Council of the League is the committee of management as required by legislation and the Constitution of the AAL.

== Ranks and Appointments ==
The Australian Air League has an internal rank structure for all uniformed members which is replicated from various organisations including military forces, police forces and Commercial aviation organisations. For Officers, there are also appointments, a position in a unit which encompass tasks that the Officer undertakes. Officer rank in the Australian Air League relates to the level of an Officers senior appointment (if they have more than one).

=== Ranks ===
The ranks are divided into two categories. The first are the Cadet ranks (referred to as N.C.O. ranks). These ranks are granted to cadet members of a Squadron, aged under 18 years, who have displayed, amongst other things, excellent leadership abilities, discipline and determination. These promotions are recommended by the Officer Commanding Squadron. The candidate for promotion must complete a variety of tasks in order to prove their suitability for the position, such as passing oral and written examinations.

In the second category are the Officer ranks. These are ranks granted to uniformed adult members of the League who have been presented their League Warrant, based upon their performance and appointment within their respective unit. These promotions are recommended by the officer's immediate superior, and are approved and issued by the Group Executive Commissioner (for all ranks up to and including Group Lieutenant) or the Council of the Australian Air League (for Group Commissioners and above).

The ranks an individual member holds is signified by:

- A series of chevrons worn on both sleeves for N.C.O. ranks
- A sky blue AAL Logo worn on the epaulettes for Warrant Officers
- A series of silver or gold stripes worn on the epaulettes for Officer ranks.
- An absence of any rank insignia indicates a rank of "Cadet".

=== Chart of N.C.O. Ranks ===
The ranks in this chart are listed with each successive rank down the page being superior to the one preceding it.

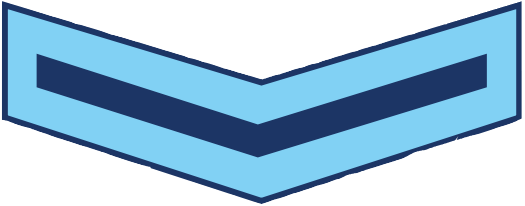
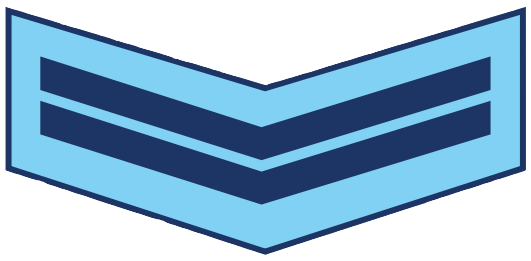
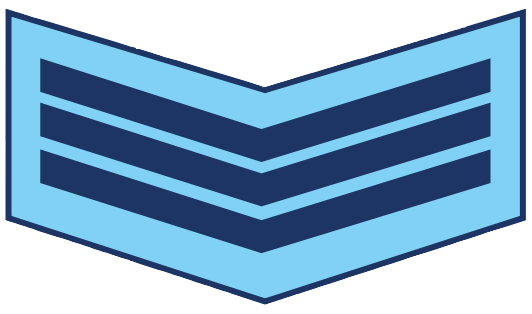
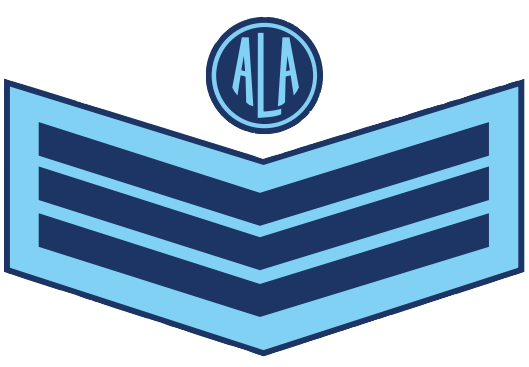
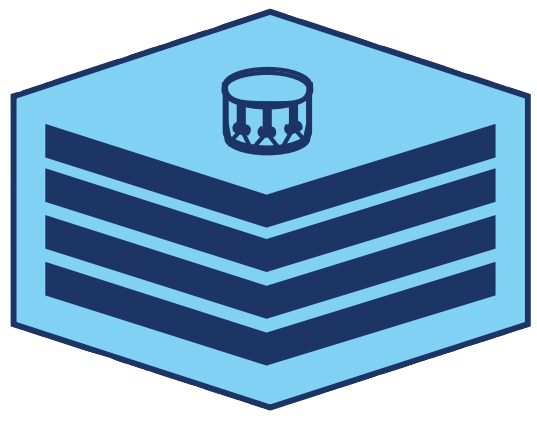
Title	Abbr.	Description	Insignia	Example
Cadet	Cdt.	The initial rank held a member under 18 years of age.	None	None
Leading Cadet	L/Cdt.	Usually the marker in a Section. Serves as assistant to a Corporal.	1 Chevron.
Corporal	Cpl.	The member in command of a Section.	2 Chevrons.
Sergeant	Sgt.	The member in command of a Flight or of a Squadron Flag Party.	3 Chevrons.
Squadron Sergeant	Sqn. Sgt.	The member in command of all Cadet members in a Squadron.	3 Chevrons + AAL pip.
Drum Major	D.Maj.	The member in command of a Band. This rank is equal to a Sergeant when not in an active band.	4 Chevrons + Drum.

=== Chart of Officer ===
The ranks in this chart are listed with each successive rank down the page being superior to the one preceding it.

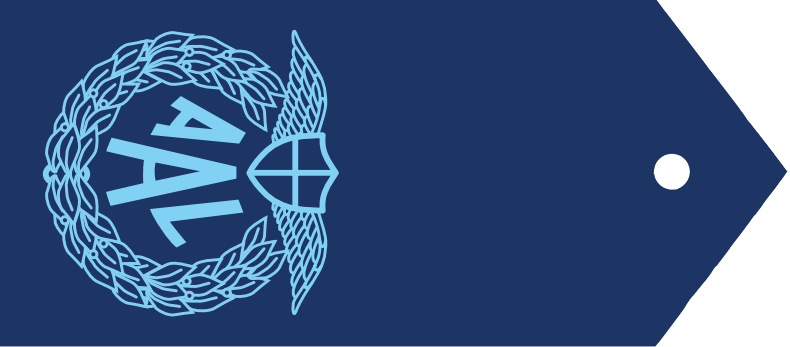
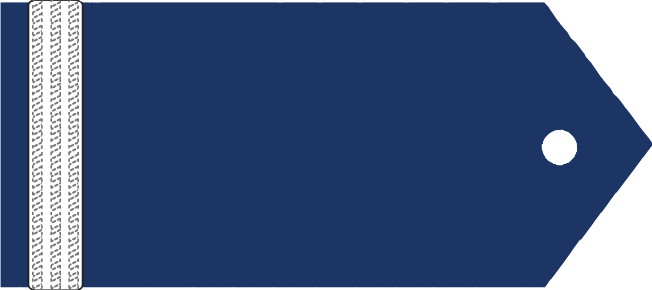
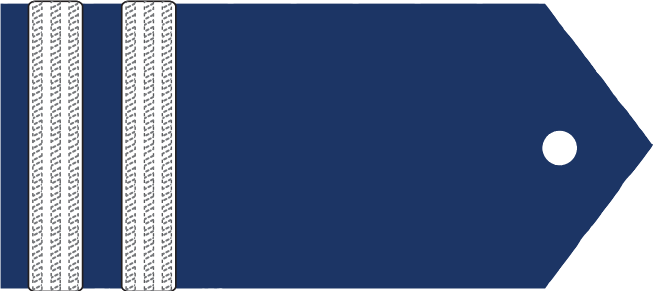
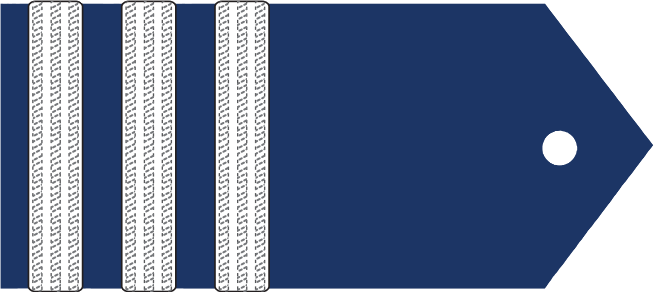
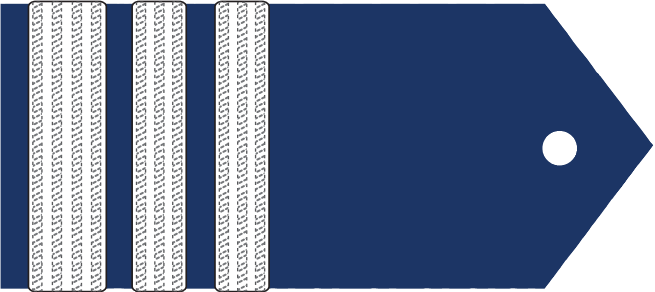
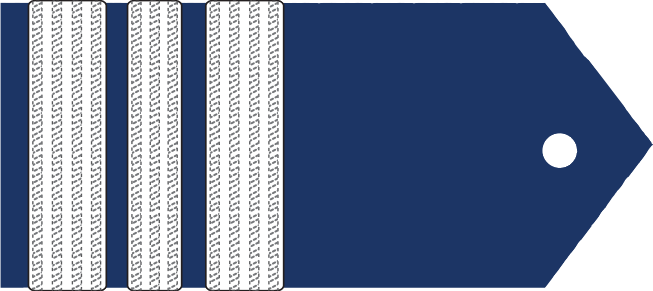
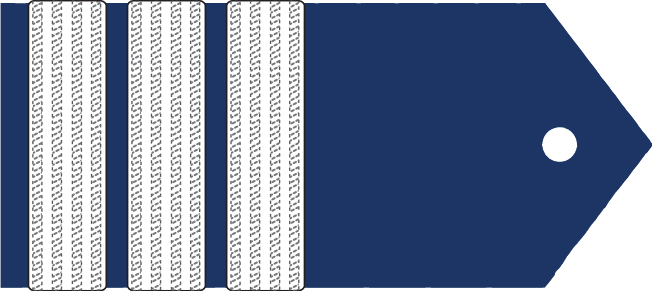
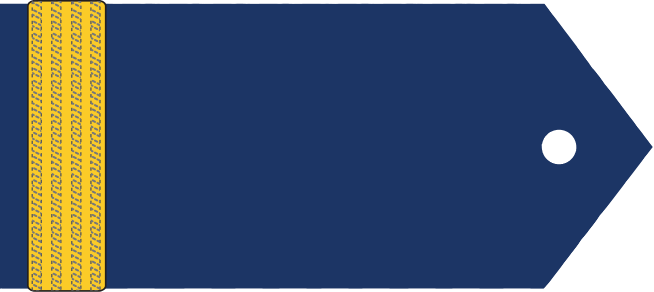
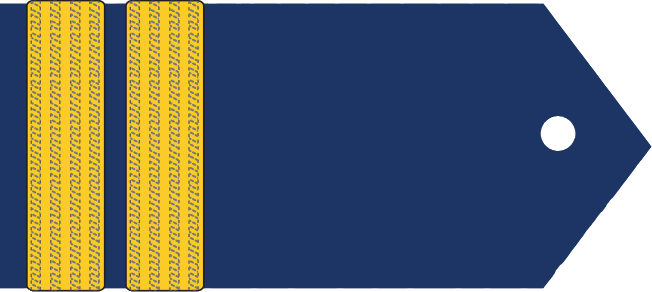
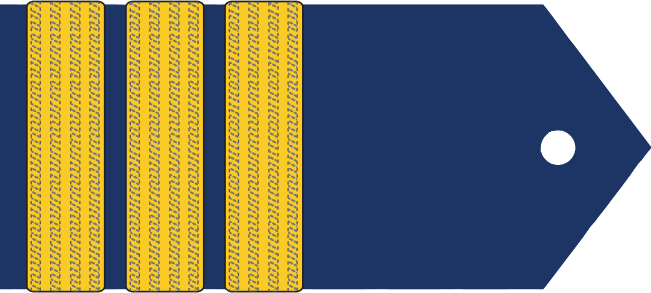
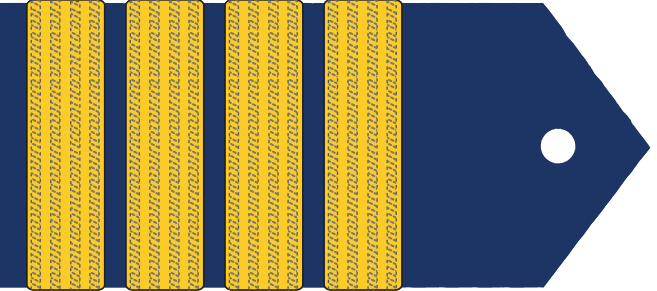
Title	Abbr.	Description	Insignia	Example
Warrant Officer	W/O	A member who is 18 years or older and who is currently completing Stage 2 of the Officer Development Program.	Sky Blue AAL Logo on Epaulettes.
2nd Officer	2nd Off.	The rank granted upon successful completion of Stage 2 of the Officer Development Program.	1 x 7 mm silver bar.
1st Officer	1st Off.	The rank granted upon successful completion of Stage 3 of the Officer Development Program and on initial appointment to a mainstream Squadron appointment.	2 x 7 mm silver bars.
Squadron Lieutenant	Sqn. Lt.	Optimum rank for Squadron Staff members.	3 x 7 mm silver bars.
Squadron Captain	Sqn. Capt.	Optimum rank for Officer Commanding Squadrons and Wing Staff Officers.	2 x 7 mm silver bars. 1 x 13 mm silver bar.
Wing Captain	Wg. Capt.	Optimum rank for Officer Commanding Wings.	1 x 7 mm silver bar. 2 x 13 mm silver bars.
Group Lieutenant	Gp. Lt.	Optimum rank for Group level Regional Officers.	3 x 13 mm silver bars.
Group Commissioner	Gp. Comr.	Optimum rank for Group Staff.	1 x 13 mm gold bar.
Lieutenant Commissioner	Lt. Comr.	Optimum rank for Group Executive Commissioners.	2 x 13 mm gold bars.
Commissioner	Comr.	Optimum rank for Federal Commissioners.	3 x 13 mm gold bar.
Chief Commissioner	Chief Comr.	Rank held by the 'Chief Commissioner' (head of the Federal Staff)	4 x 13 mm gold bars.

=== Appointments ===
The Australian Air League has a defined set of mainstream appointments for a unit that an Officer can be appointed to, however units may, as required, appoint an Officer to a non-mainstream appointment. Some examples include (but not limited to):

- Squadron Unit (e.g. Officer Commanding Squadron, Adjutant, Education, Drill)
- Wing Unit (e.g. Officer Commanding Wing, Adjutant, Education, Drill)
- Group Unit (e.g. Group Executive Commissioner, Group Operations Commissioner/Officer, Group Education Commissioner/Officer, Group Field Commissioner/Officer)
- Federal Unit (e.g. Chief Commissioner, Federal Operations Commissioner, Federal Education Commissioner, Federal Field Commissioner)

Appointments come with an optimal rank and insignia. An Officer, on initial appointment will be placed in an "Acting" capacity for a set period of time under instruction and guidance from their superior Officers. On review after that period of time an Officer may be "Confirmed" in their appointment.

When appointed in any capacity Officers are presented with an Officer Authority Card which details the appointment, date of promotion and appointment. Officers are appointed by their Group Executive Commissioner who issues their Officer Authority Card (for all appointments within the Group with the exception of Group Executive Commissioner). All Officers appointed to Federal Appointments (and Group Executive Commissioner appointments) are by decision of the Council of the League and the Officer Authority Card issued by the Chief Commissioner.

Adjutant	Air Activities	Drill	Education	Physical Activities	Quartermaster

=== Chart of Appointment levels ===
This table doesn't include all appointments available within the AAL, but describes what insignia is available for their appointment.

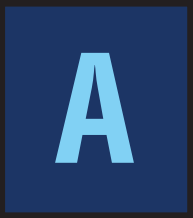
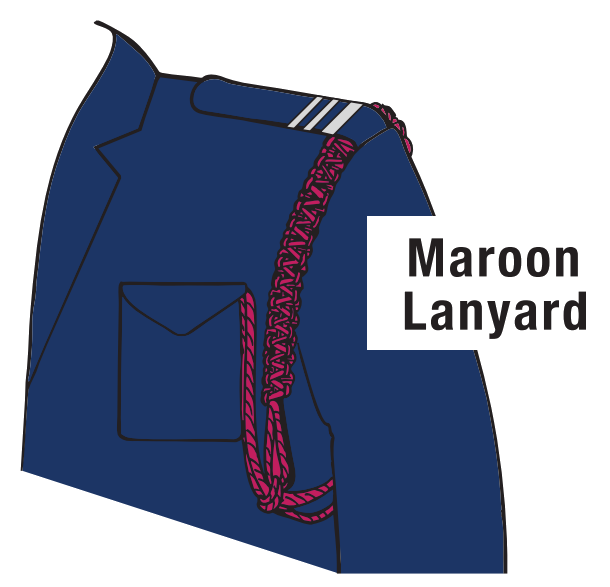
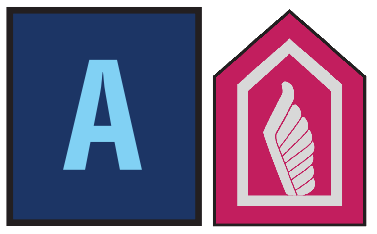
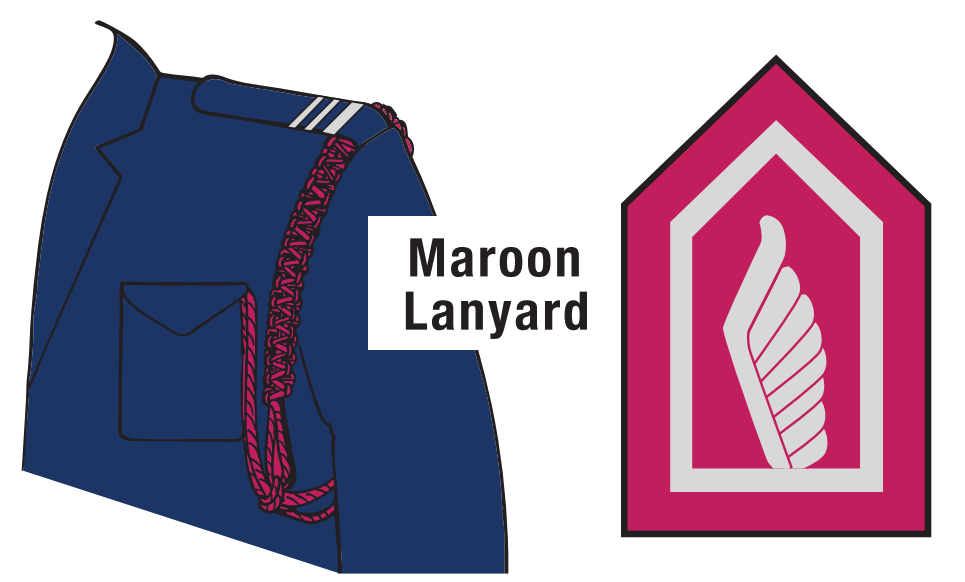
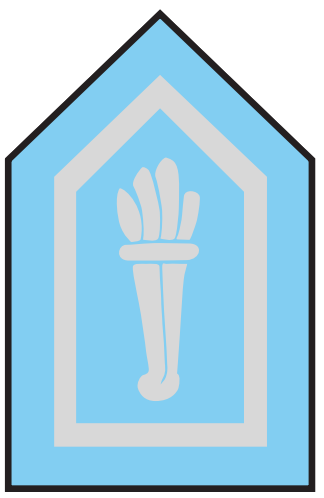
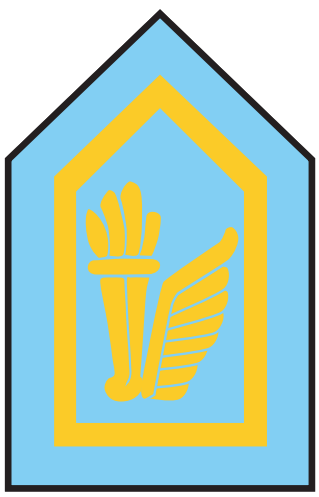
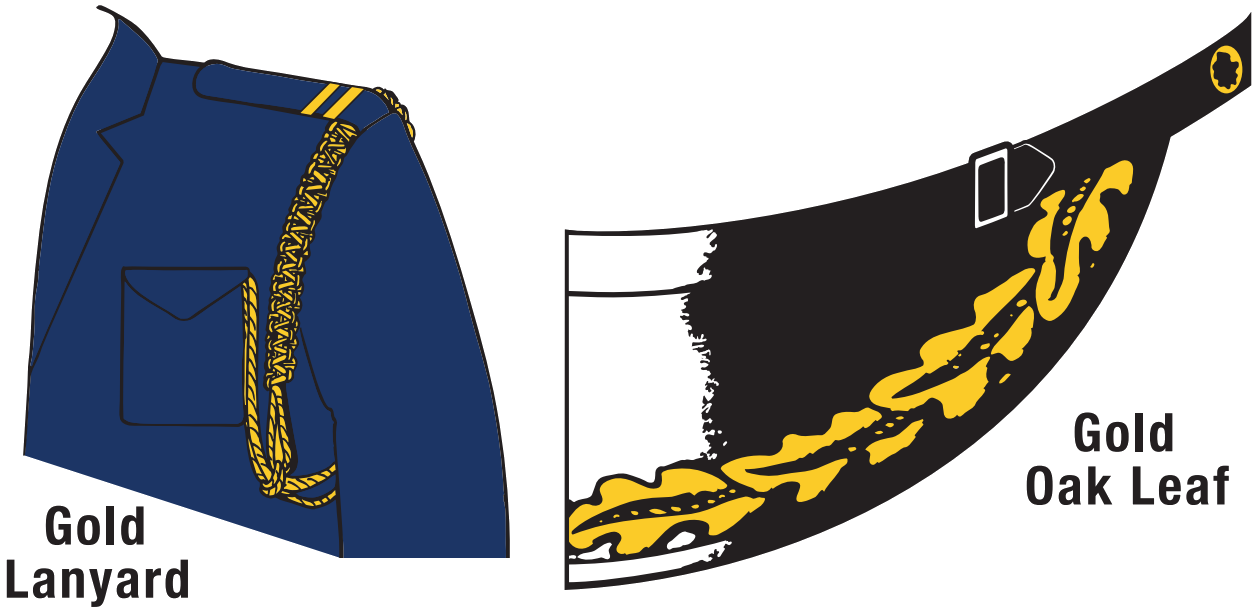
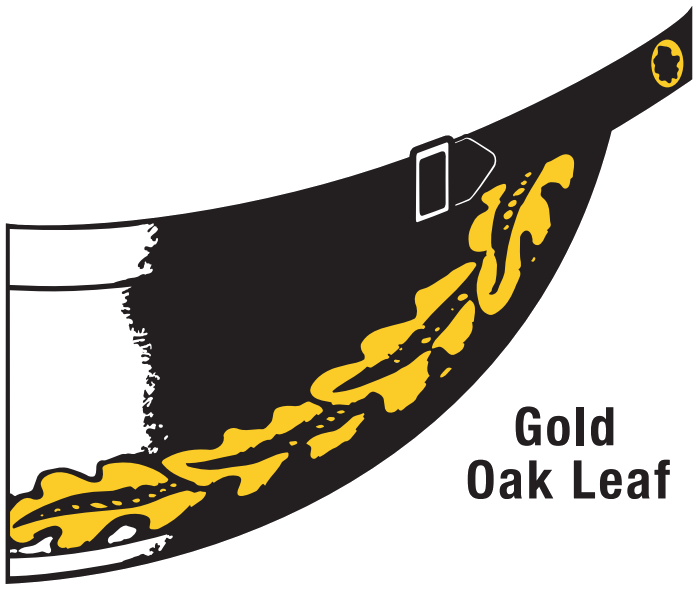
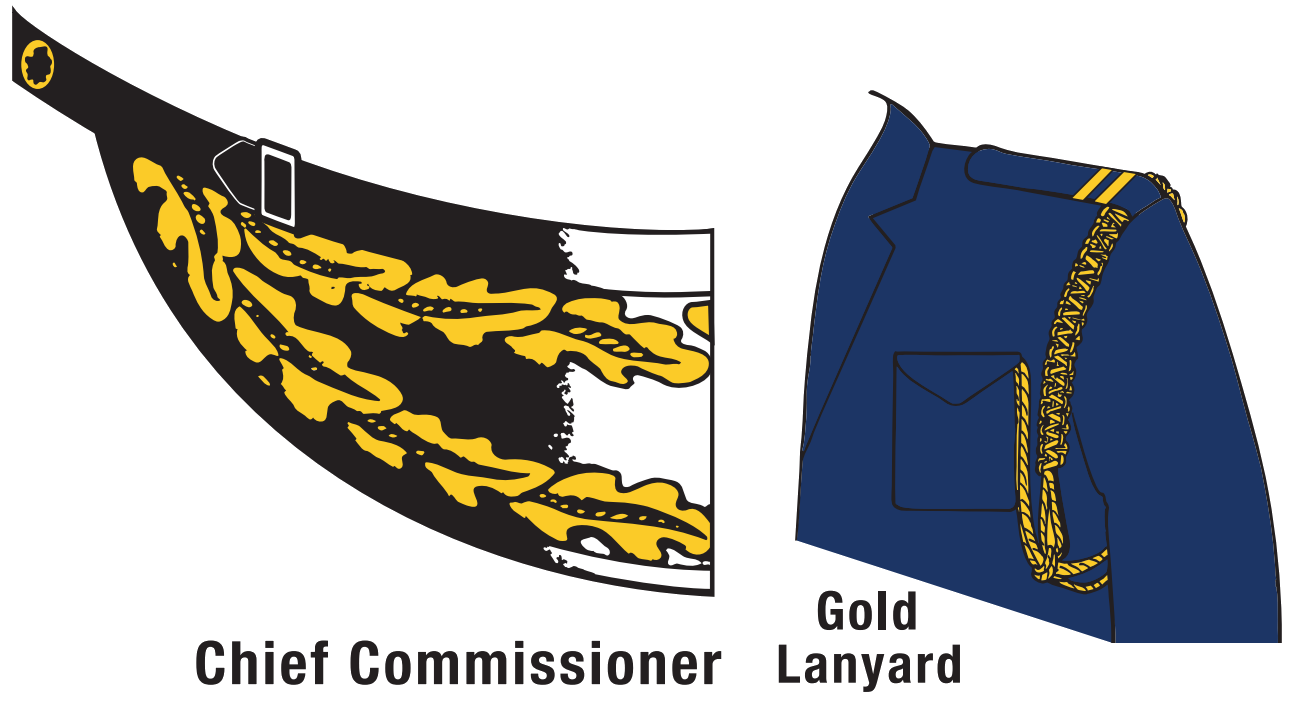
Title	Available Rank/s	Description	Insignia	Example
Squadron Staff	2nd Off - Sqn.Lt	Any Officer who holds a non-command Squadron Appointment.	Fabric Badge with letter denoting appointment
Officer Commanding Squadron	Sqn.Capt.	The Officer holding the Command Appointment for a Squadron Unit.	Maroon Lanyard with Silver collar badges
Wing Staff	Sqn.Capt.	Any Officer who holds a non-command Wing Appointment.	Maroon with Silver Trim Staff Tabs with a Fabric badge with letter denoting appointment
Officer Commanding Wing	Wg.Capt.	The Officer holding the Command Appointment for a Wing Unit.	Maroon Lanyard with Maroon with Silver Trim Staff Tabs
Group Staff (Officer)	Gp.Lt	An Officer holding a non-command Group appointment who has not yet been awarded the optimum rank.	Sky blue Staff Tab with Silver Trim
Group Staff (Commissioner)	Gp.Comr.	An Officer holding a non-command Group appointment who has been awarded the optimum rank.	Sky blue Staff tab with Gold Trim
Group Executive Commissioner	Lt.Comr.	The Officer holding the Command Appointment for a Group Unit.	Gold AAL collar badges, with 1 row of oak leaf on the Officer Cap and a Gold lanyard.
Federal Staff	Comr.	An Officer holding a non-command Federal appointment.	Gold AAL collar badges, with 1 row of oak leaf on the Officer cap
Chief Commissioner	Chief.Comr.	The Officer holding the Command Appointment for the Federal Unit.	Gold AAL collar badges, with 2 rows of oak leaf on the Officer cap and a Gold Lanyard.

== Activities ==
Australian Air League members participate and compete in several activities including Camping, Ceremonial Drill, Model Aircraft Building and Flying, Sports and the Duke of Edinburgh's Award. Several members have achieved and have been awarded with their Gold Duke of Edinburgh. Community Service is a major part of an Australian Air League members life. They volunteer for events like the NSW Premier's Senior Citizens Concert, the Red Shield Appeal for the Salvation Army and Clean Up Australia Day. They also participate in local festivals and ANZAC Day Parades.

Education classes have been provided for the benefit of members. They include (but not limited to):

- Aero Engines
- Electronics
- Meteorology
- Navigation
- Photography
- Radio and Radar
- Spaceflight
- Theory of Flight
- Cabin Crew

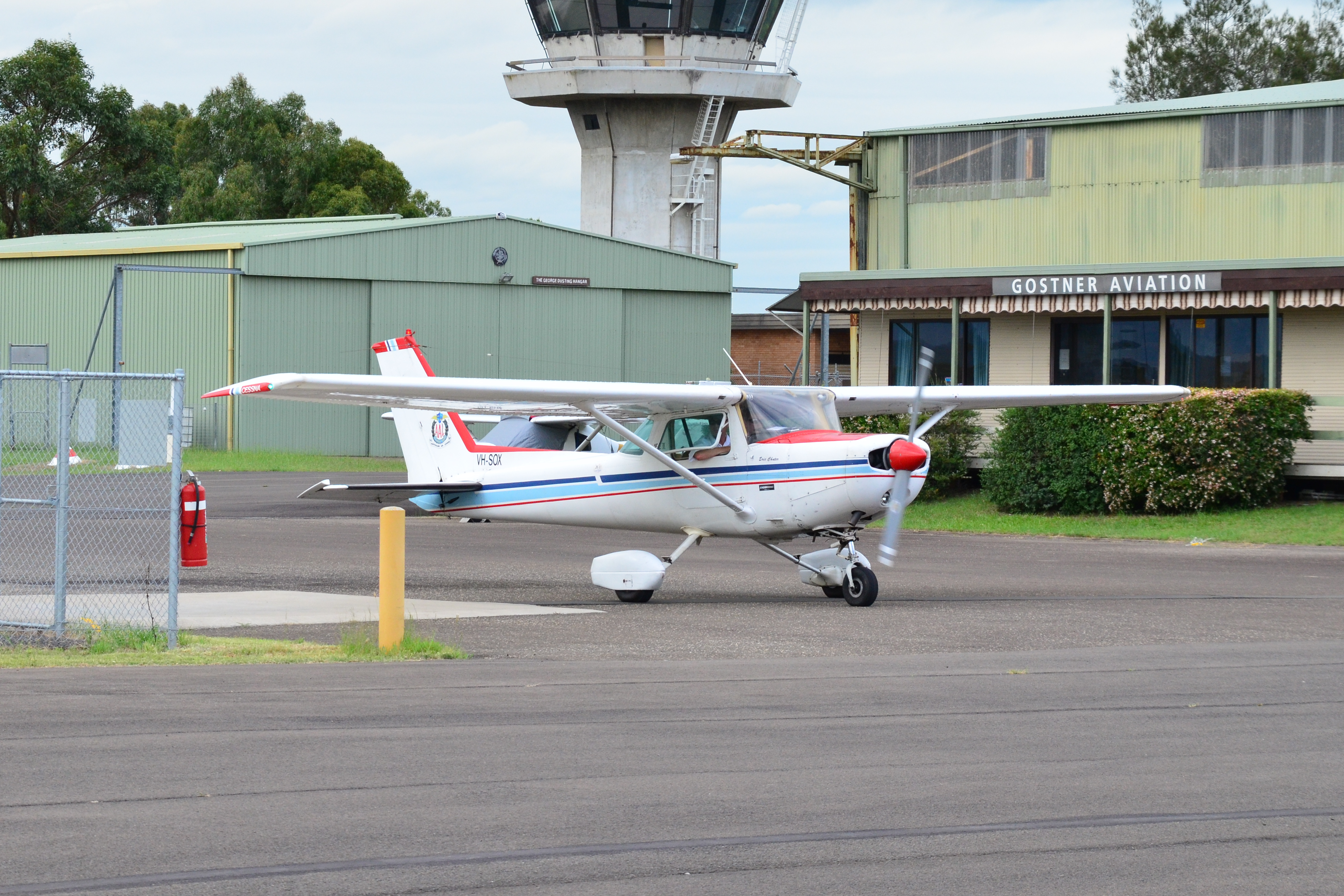
VH-SOX, a Cessna 152 operated by the Australian Air League.

Members also have the opportunity to complete the AAL General Diploma, the AAL Aviation Diploma, and the AAL Gold Diploma by obtaining the selected amount of education badges the courses prescribes within a particular time period.

Members can also commence flight training at the age of 14. The league operates a flying school from Camden Airport, south-west of Sydney with the NSW Air Activities Centre operating as a volunteer-run, not-for-profit Flight Training Organisation (FTO) and Charter (Air Transport - smaller aeroplane) Operator. The fleet of aircraft owned and operated by the Australian Air League includes:

- VH-SOX, Cessna 152 (pictured right)
- VH-PAT, Cessna 172 Skyhawk
- VH-LRA, Piper PA-28 Warrior

== Reviews ==
The Australian Air League holds Reviews on several levels of Units, ranging from Wing Reviews, Group Reviews and Australian Air League Reviews. Group Reviews are usually held annually and Australian Air League Reviews are usually held every 2–3 years. Reviews are held in order to maintain a sense of healthy competition between Groups, Wings and Squadrons. The basic function of a Review is to investigate the standard of ceremonial drill in the Air League.

== League Badges and Medals ==
The Australian Air League maintains an internal system of medals and badges for all uniformed members, drawing inspiration from a range of organisations including military forces and other youth organisations like scouts. These awards recognise achievement, service, qualifications, and participation across various aspects of the organisation.

Medals are typically awarded to acknowledge service, dedication, or notable accomplishments over time, while badges represent specific skills, training, or roles attained by a member. Together, the medals and badges worn by a member reflect their experience, contributions, and progression within the Australian Air League.

=== Service Bars ===
1 Year Service Bar	3 Year Service Bar	5 year Service Bar	7 year Service Bar

=== Medals ===
Medals are displayed in their official order of wear.

Conspicuous Service	Service Medal; 10 Year General	Service Medal; 10 Year Officer	Meritorious Service Award	Distinguished Service Award

== Volunteer Support ==
As a not for profit organisation, the Australian Air League relies on the help of a network of volunteers to carry out the various tasks which need to be fulfilled in order for the organisation to exist.

=== Associate Membership ===
Associate membership provides a way for adults to join as non-uniformed, but financial, members of the League. Associate members are eligible to serve on the Squadron 'Branch Committee' from where they can directly assist the squadron by helping to keep track of the Squadrons finances and co-ordinating fund-raising activities.

Associate members are also eligible to participate in most functions and activities that are open to uniformed members.

=== League Membership ===
Alternatively an adult may wish to join the League as an Officer. Such people are inducted into the League's Five stage Officer Development Program, where they are promoted to the rank of Warrant Officer and enrolled in the first two stages which take the new Officer through a series of courses covering the day-to-day operations of a squadron, the expectations they will face, and correct procedure for handling different situations.

Upon completing the first two stages the new member is promoted to the rank of Second Officer and is attached to a unit, usually the squadron in their local area, to undertake further training.

== Child safety and controversies ==
The Australian Air League was among a number of institutions publicly named by the Australian Government in July 2020 for not having signed up to the National Redress Scheme (NRS) for survivors of institutional child sexual abuse, a scheme established in response to the Royal Commission into Institutional Responses to Child Sexual Abuse. The following day the AAL stated that it had signed and submitted a letter of intent to join the NRS, describing participation as the preferred pathway for supporting victim-survivors. The organisation has subsequently published updated child-safety policies and reporting procedures and states its commitment to the Commonwealth Child Safe Standards.

The Royal Commission did not publish a stand-alone case study on the AAL; however, its recommendations underpin the operation of the NRS and the development of child-safe standards across Australian youth organisations.

=== Sexual abuse cases and whistleblower controversy ===
In 2004, former Oakleigh Squadron lieutenant Peter Lance Diwell was convicted of multiple child sexual offences, including buggery, attempted buggery, gross indecency and indecent assault, committed against boys aged between 11 and 15 in the 1970s and 1980s. The County Court of Victoria heard that Diwell himself had reported experiencing abuse as a cadet in the 1960s. He had previously served a prison sentence in 1985 for abusing two boys, and in 2004 was sentenced to eight and a half years’ imprisonment with a minimum term of five and a half years.

In 2023, former Royal Australian Air Force and Qantas flight trainer Todd Andrew Oakley, who had served as the Australian Air League’s Queensland group executive commissioner, was committed to stand trial in Queensland on charges of rape, sexual assault and unlawful sodomy of persons under 18. Police allege the offences took place between 1998 and 2002 against two teenage Australian Defence Force cadets while Oakley was supervising them at RAAF Amberley and other sites. Oakley resigned from the Air League in December 2021, prior to the charges, and the organisation stated it could not comment further while the case was before the courts.

Reporting in The Australian alleged that Oakley, while subject to earlier allegations aired in the Royal Commission into Institutional Responses to Child Sexual Abuse, remained in senior executive roles within the Air League and participated in its 2020 decision not to join the National Redress Scheme. After Queensland authorities revoked his clearance to work with children in 2021, he was interviewed for another senior role in the organisation. A leaked recording of that interview was circulated by whistleblowers, some of whom were later expelled from the League. The revelations led to public criticism, including a petition signed by more than 8,500 people calling for the federal council to resign.

Civil proceedings relating to historical child sexual abuse have also been brought against the AAL in Victoria. In Carter (a pseudonym) v Australian Air League Incorporated & Anor [2024] VSC 95, the Supreme Court of Victoria considered interlocutory issues (including subpoenas for Medicare records) in proceedings alleging historical abuse between 1978 and 1980. Further allegations in this matter were brought against the AAL and a former squadron leader regarding conduct said to have occurred at the Carnegie squadron. The judgment records that the former leader had since been convicted of sexual offences.
