= Department of the Master-General of the Ordnance =

Former department within the British War Office

Department of the Master-General of the Ordnance was a department within the British War Office. Created in 1855 to replace some of the duties of the Board of Ordnance and itself replaced by the Ordnance Board, now within the Ministry of Defence (United Kingdom).

== See also ==
- Master-General of the Ordnance
