= Roude Léiw =

Civil ensign of Luxembourg

- Proportion: 7:5
- Adopted: De facto: 13th Century; De jure 23 June 1972
- Design: Red lion on ten alternating horizontal stripes of blue and white

De Roude Léiw (The red lion) is the common name used for the civil ensign of Luxembourg. It can also refer more specifically to the heraldic animal of Luxembourg, which is often used as an emblem or mascot for various institutions and symbols related to Luxembourg.

The ensign consists of a red lion with a golden crown, claws and tongue on a background of ten horizontal bars of blue and white.

Being used since medieval times, the Roude Léiw is seen as one of the most ancient and traditional symbols representing the identity and heritage of the Luxembourgish people.

== History ==
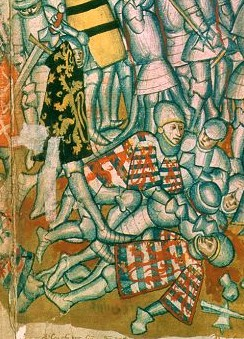
Depiction of members of the House of Luxembourg at the Battle of Worringen

=== Origins ===
The ensign is derived from the coat of arms of Luxembourg, which traces its origins back to the 13th century as coat of arms of the House of Luxembourg.

The first sovereign of the House of Luxembourg known to have used a red lion on a blue and white striped background was Henry V the Blond (1216–1281), Count of Luxembourg. Since then, the design has remained mostly unchanged.

It has been used as standard and coat of arms of the counts, and later the dukes of Luxembourg.

In 1972, the Roude Léiw was for the first time declared to be an official symbol of the Grand-Duchy of Luxembourg by law. Since then, the Roude Léiw was used as the official naval and civil ensign of Luxembourg.

Article 4 of the Law of the 23th of June 1972 concerning the national emblems sets the appearance of the Roude Léiw as the civil ensign as follows:

Art. 4.

Le pavillon de la batellerie et de l'aviation se compose d'une laize de tissus aux proportions de 7 à 5 comportant un burelé d'argent et d'azur de dix pièces au lion rampant de gueules, orienté vers la hampe, couronné, armé et lampassé d'or, la queue fourchue et passée en sautoir. La description du revers correspond à celle de l'avers.

— Loi du 23 juin 1972 sur les emblèmes nationaux

It states that the civil ensign has the form of a fabric banner with the proportions 7 to 5. It consists of ten horizontal stripes, of alternating blue and white color. Overlaid is a red lion in attacking position showing a split tail, as well as a golden crown, claws and tongue. The lion is oriented to the heraldic right. Furthermore, it is noted that the reverse of the ensign is designed according to the same description.

The precise color shades to be used are set by Article 2 of the Grand-Ducal Regulation of the 27th of July 1993 specifying the chromatic shades of the colours of the national flag of Luxembourg and the civil ensign:

Art. 2.

Les couleurs du pavillon de la batellerie et de l'aviation sont définies de la façon suivante:

•le rouge correspond à la norme Pantone 032C, le bleu à la norme Pantone 299C et le jaune à la norme Pantone 116C.

— Règlement grand-ducal du 27 juillet 1993 précisant la composition chromatique des couleurs du drapeau national luxembourgeois et du pavillon de la batellerie et de l'aviation.

The color shades are defined using the Pantone scheme as shades red Pantone 032C, blue Pantone 299C and yellow Pantone 116C.

| Scheme | Red | Light Blue | Yellow |
|---|---|---|---|
| Pantone | 032C | 299C | 116C |

=== 2006 initiative to introduce the Roude Léiw as national flag ===
On 5 October 2006, deputy Michel Wolter (CSV) introduced draft bill No. 5617 into parliament which sought to replace the tricolor national flag of Luxembourg with the Roude Léiw. The main argument of Wolter was that the tricolor is easily confused with the national flag of The Netherlands, the only difference being lighter shades of red and blue. This would lead to much confusion in an international environment, where the flag of Luxembourg is much less recognized.

Furthermore, Wolter argued that the historic value of the Roude Léiw was much greater in contrast to the tricolor, which only dated back to the Belgian Revolution.

Following Wolter's initiative, there was an extensive public discussion about the issue deeply dividing the population. The topic was also widely covered in national media.

Soon after the proposition of the bill, supporters of the flag change united under the name "Initiativ Roude Léiw" ("Initiative red lion"). A PR campaign using the slogan "Ech sin dofir!" ("I'm in favor!") was launched, including the distribution of over 60,000 bumper stickers, and the collection of signatures in an online petition. As of 12 February 2007, the website of the Initiativ Roude Léiw claimed to have handed a list with over 26,500 signatures in favor of a change to the Chamber of Deputies.

The movement was openly criticised for a lack of transparency regarding members and funding of the organisation, of which many informations were not revealed to the public. Even though the movement claimed to be of an independent nature without political affiliations, this was openly questioned and close ties to Wolter or his party CSV were speculated. This speculation is supported by the fact that the website of the movement claimed to have transferred administratorship to Wolter as of 15 April 2009.

Opponents of the initiative formed counter-movements such as the "Initiativ Roud-Wäiss-Blo" ("Initiative red-white-blue"), wanting to keep the tricolor as the national flag. As of 9 October 2007, an online petition of the movement had collected 1,446 signatures in total. The Initiativ Roud-Wäiss-Blo advocated for a preservation of the tricolor as national flag alongside the Roude Léiw as civil ensign of Luxembourg. The website of Initiativ Roud-Wäiss-Blo listed the following arguments against a change of flag:

- The Roude Léiw already holds official status as the naval ensign of Luxembourg. Everyone who wishes to use it as a symbol to represent Luxembourg at patriotic events (such as the Grand Duke's Birthday or sporting events) can do so freely without the need for declaring the Roude Léiw the national flag of Luxembourg.
- The lion alongside slogans like "Roude Léiw huel se!" ("Red lion catch them!") is a militant symbol and bears the risk of evoking nationalistic and far right sentiments, and is therefore inappropriate to appear on the national flag of the country.
- Flags featuring coats of arms are most commonly used as flags of provinces or local governments (e.g. Saarland), and are therefore seen as unsuitable for a national flag.
- Changing the national flag to the Roude Léiw would not resolve the problem of being confusable with other flags, as other entities already use designs similar or identical to the Roude Léiw, for example the Belgian province of Luxembourg, or the Belgian commune of Grâce-Hollogne.
- Other countries share similar flags as well, for example Chad and Romania or Indonesia and Monaco.
- The tricolor with its origins in the Belgian Revolution stands for progressive values such as liberty, equality and fraternity. Therefore, the tricolor is seen as more suitable than the Roude Léiw, which in this same logic would represent the feudal values of the Middle Ages.
- The national flag of a country needs to be easily reproducible, which is not the case with the Roude Léiw.

A sizable fraction of the population also found the entire discussion redundant, questioning the benefits of such a change or were indifferent about the issue. This led to the formation of satirical movements, contributing to the discussion with a certain sense of irony and sarcasm such as the "Initiativ Rosa Rouden Panther" ("Initiative pink panther"), or the "Initiativ Schwaarzt Rëndvéi"

The Initiativ Schwaarzt Rëndvéi was by far the most popular among this type of movements, and claimed to represent the desire for implementation of a national flag featuring a black cow. The black cow was chosen as a satirical allusion of Michel Wolter, "Rëndvéi" being an insult in the sense of "idiot" or "dork", and black being the color traditionally associated with Wolter's party CSV.

It started a PR campaign satirizing the campaign of Initiativ Roude Léiw, selling stickers featuring the civil ensign with a black cow and the slogan "Ech sinn dofir - hu soss keng Péng" ("I'm in favor - I don't have other problems"). An online petition started by the movement gathered 868 signatures as of 9 June 2007.

==== Political reactions ====
Most members of parliament, even within Wolter's own party CSV, reflected a position of indifference about the issue. Many questioned the benefits of such a change, stating that other political issues were more important at the moment. The council of State shared these views, openly criticising the redundance of the project in assessment containing some ironic notes published on 8 April 2008. The draft bill was treated by multiple parliamentary commissions, but eventually rejected by the Juncker-Asselborn I cabinet.

On 23 November 2009, Prime minister Jean-Claude Juncker introduced draft bill No. 6087 into parliament, proposing a compromised solution amending Article 2 of the law of 1972 and allowing the use of the Roude Léiw as national flag restricted to the territory of Luxembourg.

The Council of State noted in its assessment of the law published on 23 March 2010 that it was "not convinced of the necessity of a second national flag", and that the lack of regulation about the number and practical use of the two national flags "leads to a situation of uncertainety in which the Council of State does not see a solution which would not drift into ridiculousness."

== Gallery ==
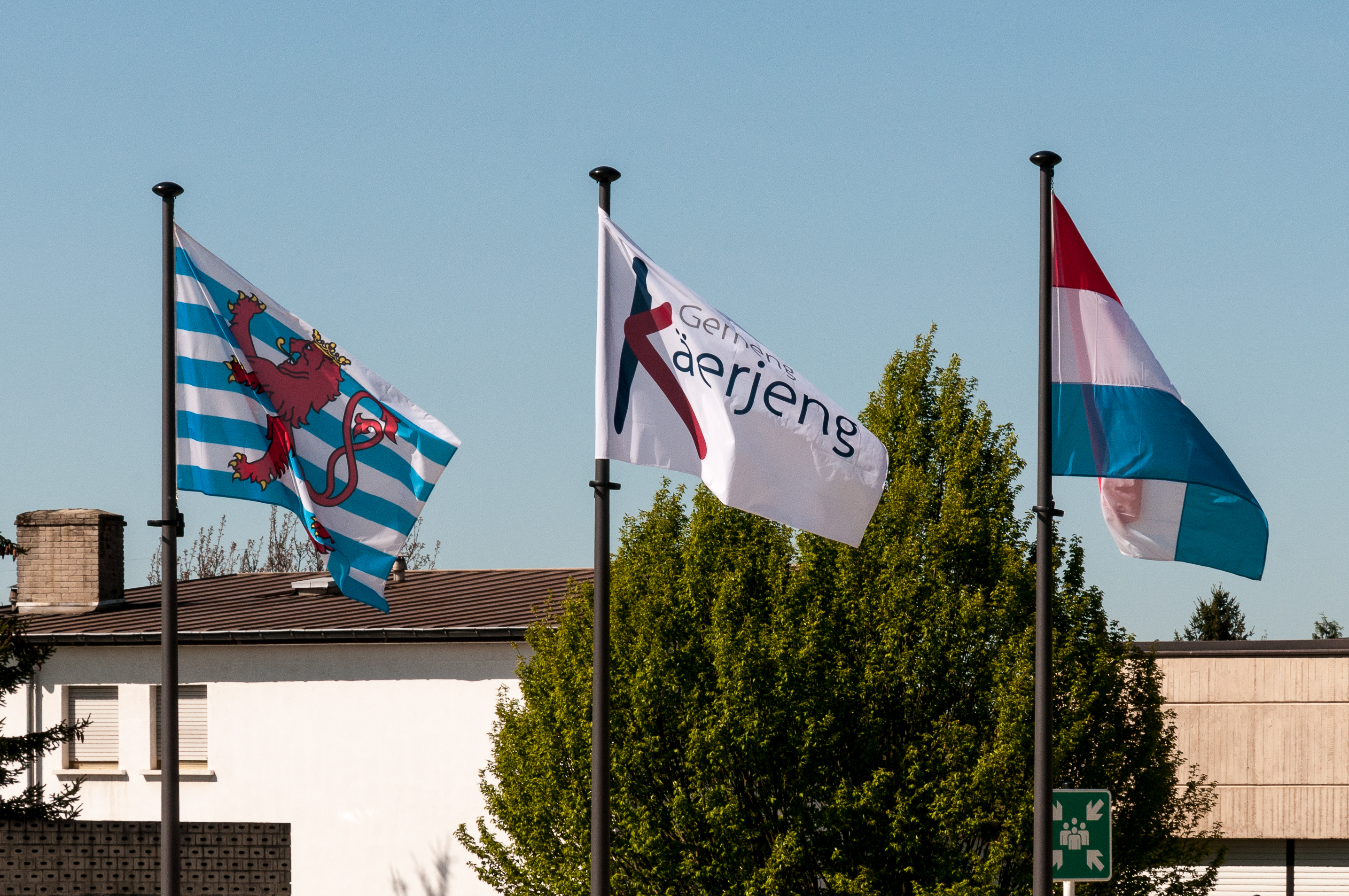
Roude Léiw beig flown alongside the tricolor, Käerjeng

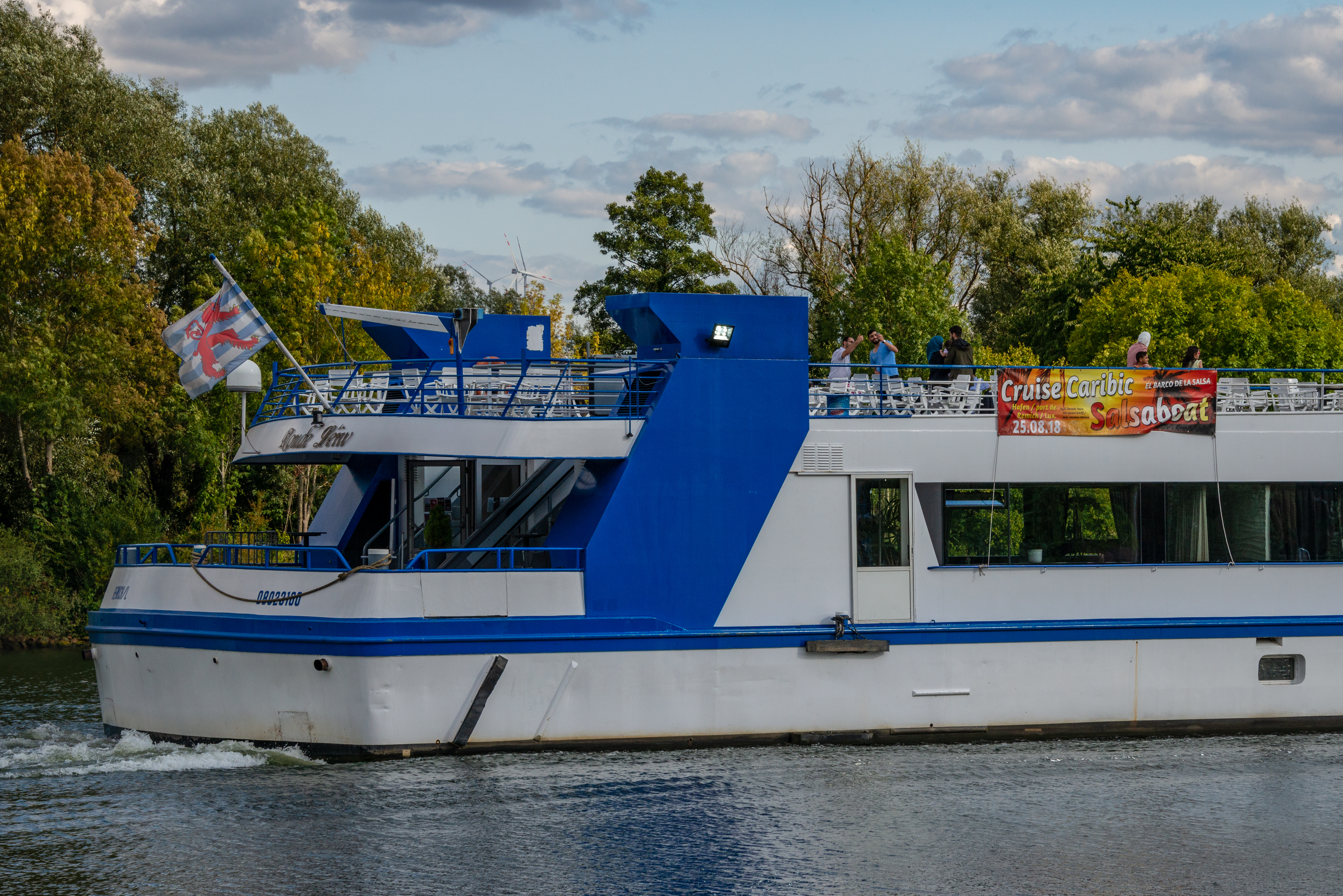
Roude Léiw used as naval ensign

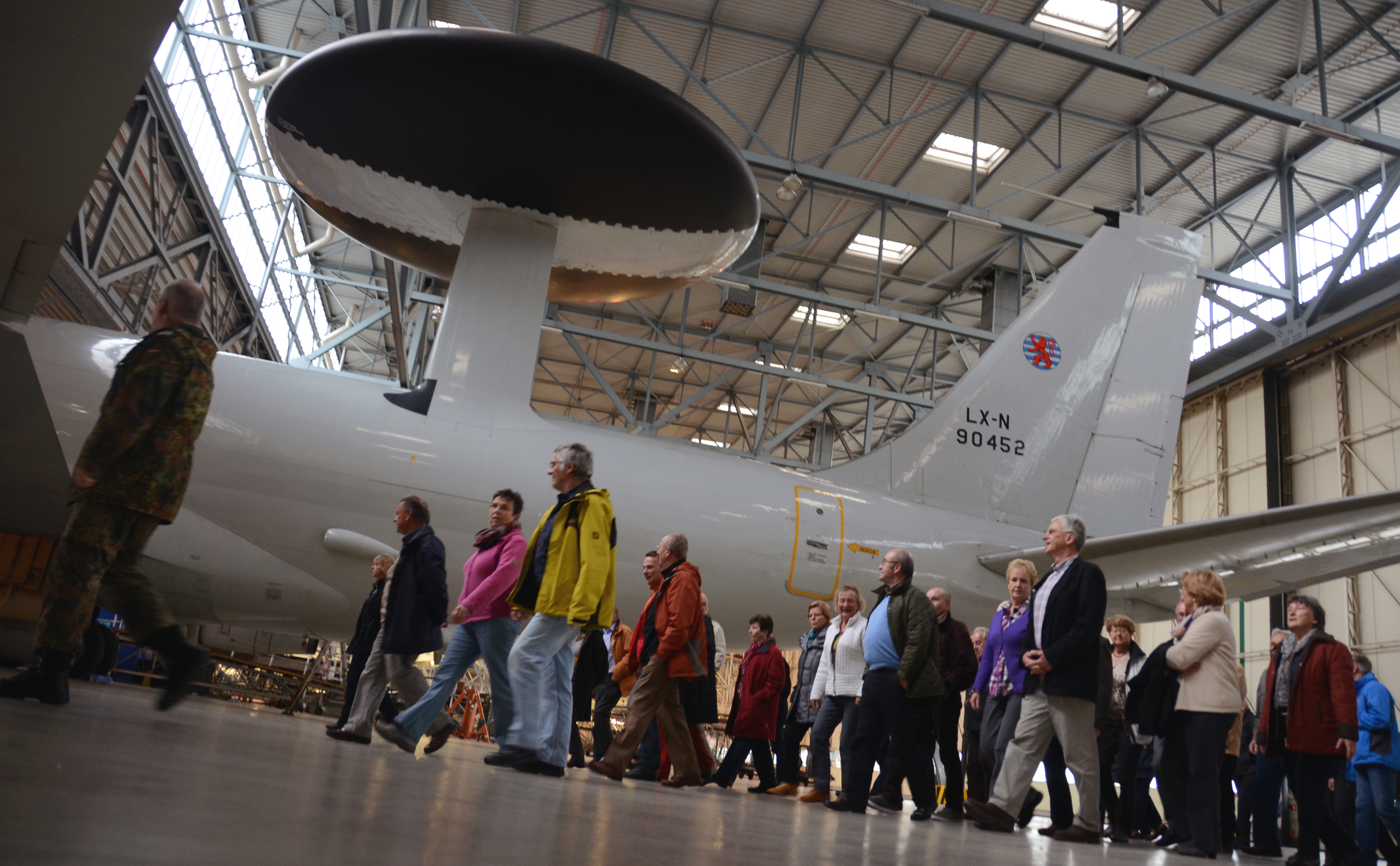
Roude Léiw as military roundel on the rear of NATO AWACS aircraft

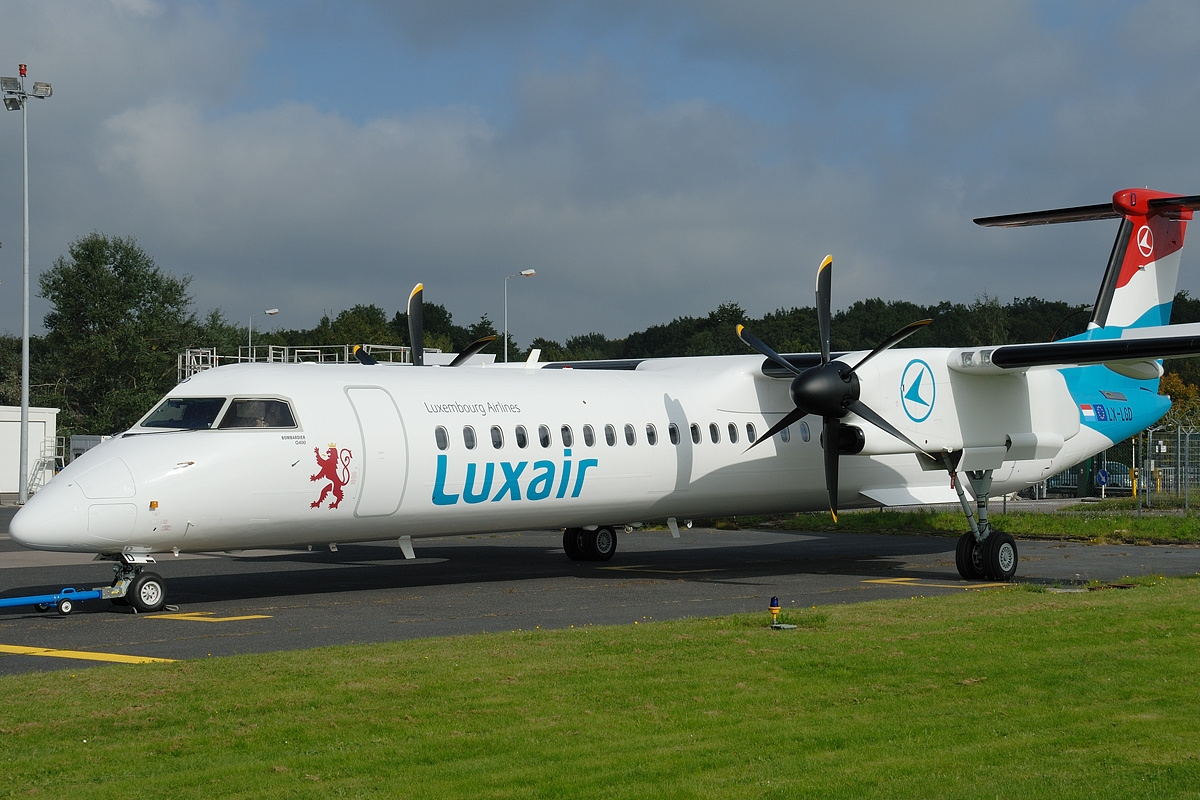
Roude Léiw as national symbol on a Luxair aircraft

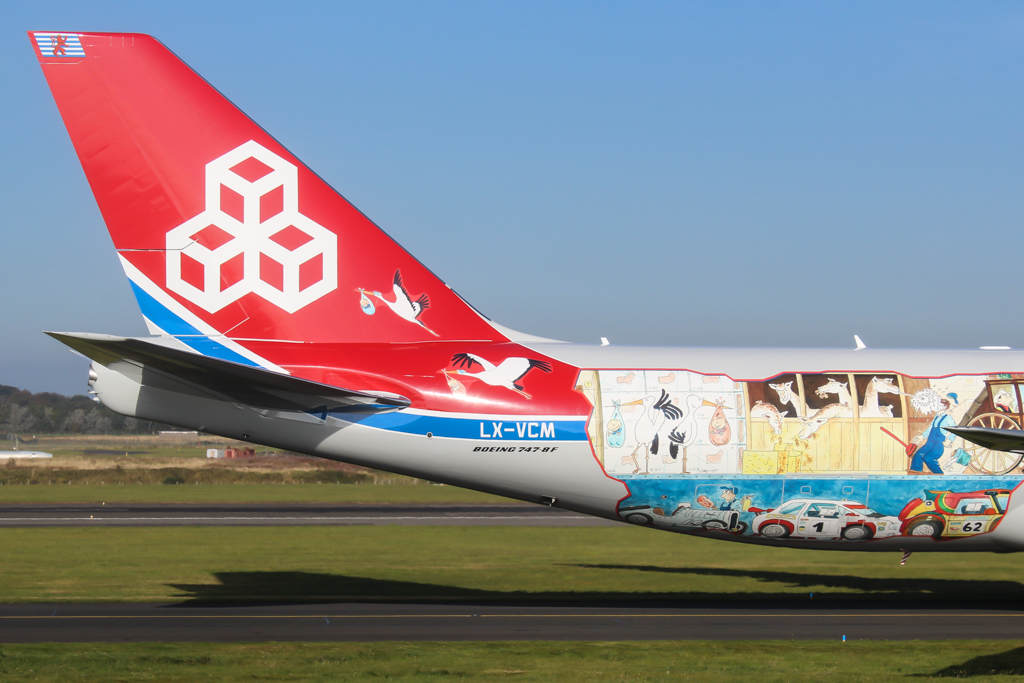
Roude Léiw on a Cargolux aircraft

Logo of the government of Luxembourg featuring a red lion
