= British civil air ensign =

Civil aviation flag for the UK

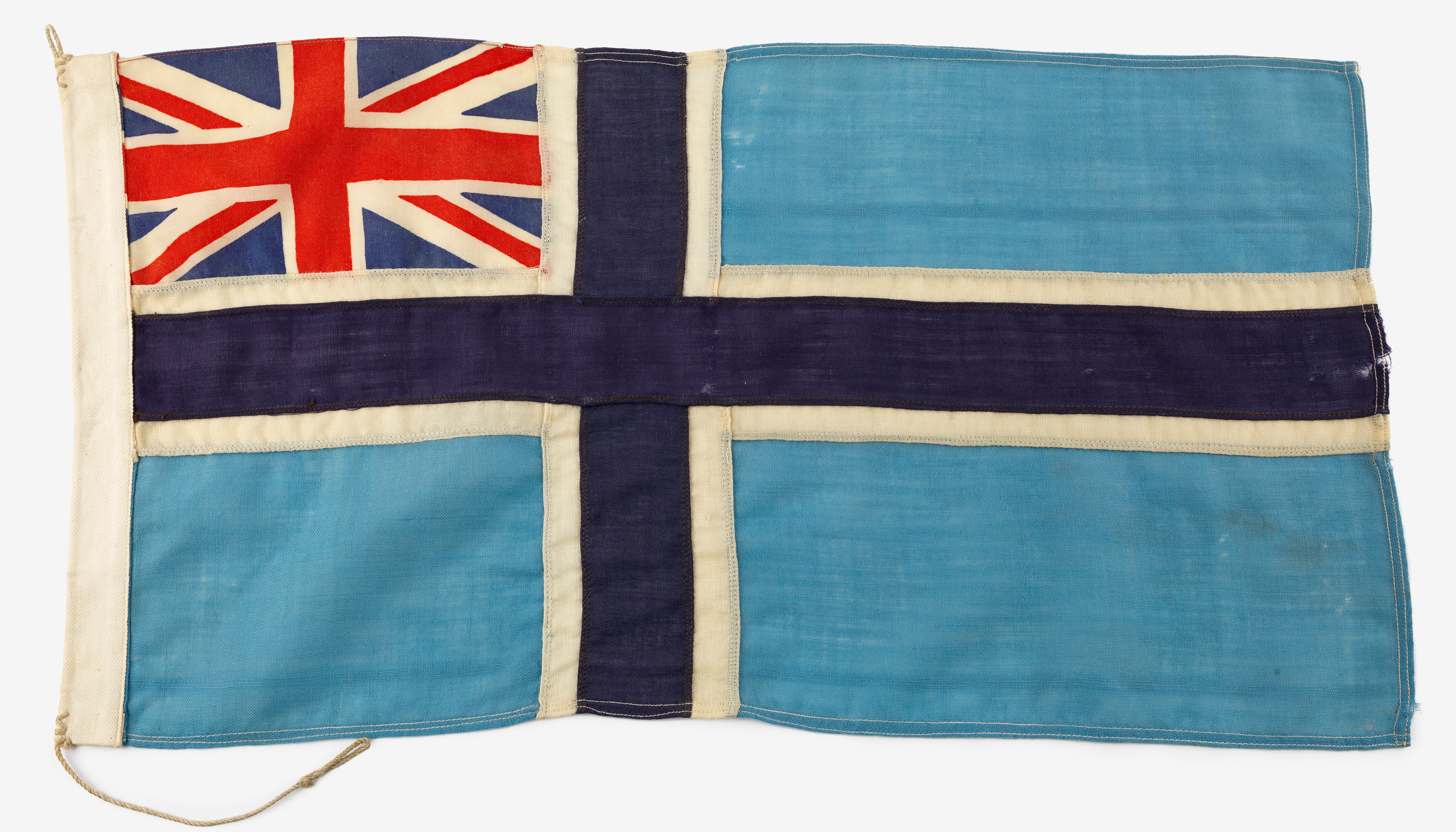
Civil air ensign used by Neville Chamberlain whilst travelling to a conference in Munich in 1938; its proportions are that of the Nordic cross instead of Saint George's Cross.

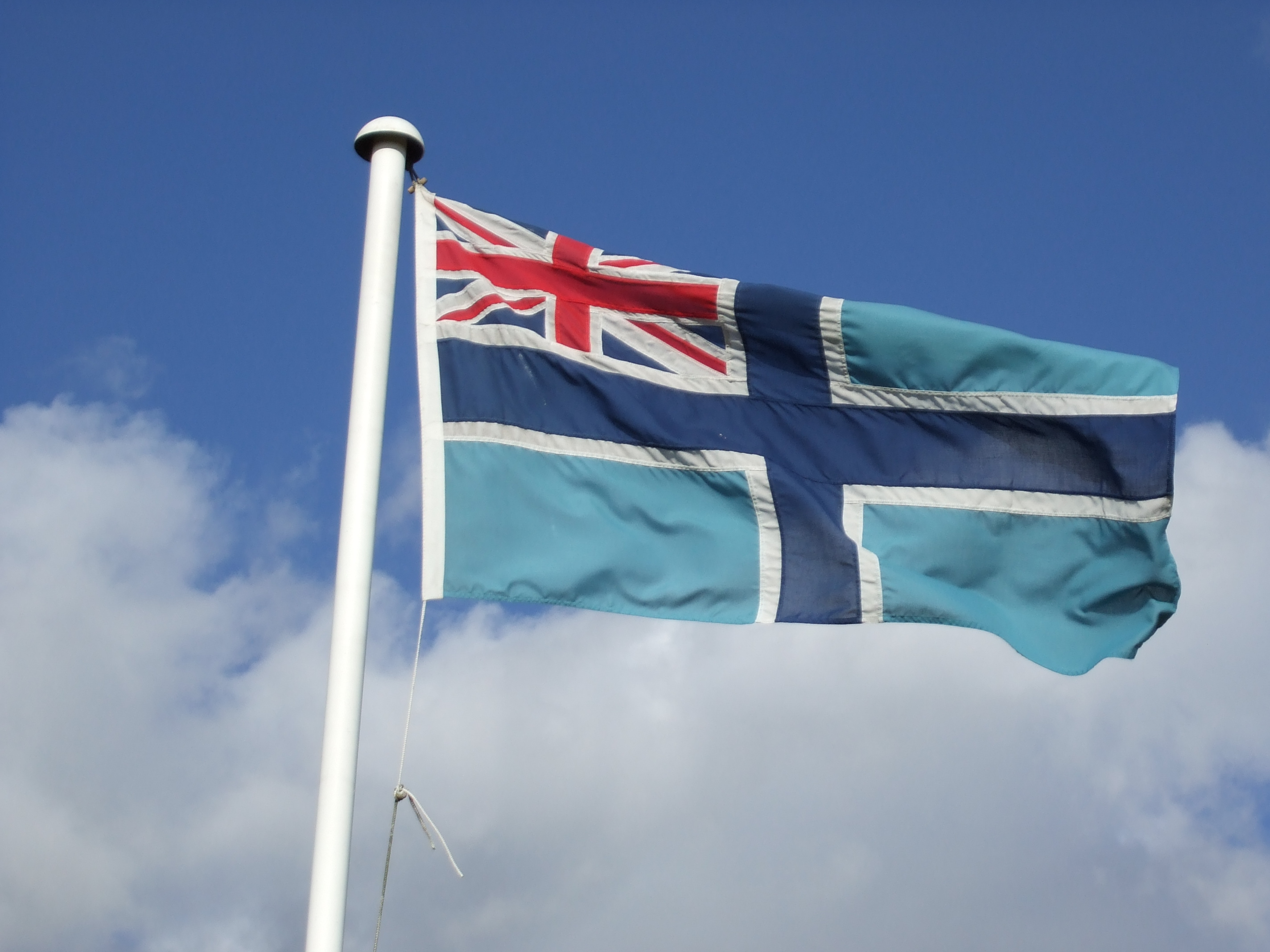
The civil air ensign flying at Hunsdon Airfield

The British civil air ensign is the flag that may be flown at civil aviation establishments in the United Kingdom and be displayed on UK-registered civil aircraft. It should be flown at civilian air facilities as the national flag in place of the Union Flag.

The ensign's field is light blue and has a dark blue Saint George's Cross which is fimbriated white placed overall. The Union Flag is in the canton.

The civil air ensign was instituted by an Order in Council on 11 August 1931. The order stated that "An ensign called the Civil Air Ensign is the proper national colour to be flown by aircraft and air transport undertakings and at aerodromes." The first civil air ensign to be flown in London was hoisted by Mrs Victor Bruce, the noted British woman aviator.

The 1931 Order was revoked by the Civil Air Ensign Order made on 18 March 1937 additionally permitting the use of the flag on buildings used by the Ministry of Civil Aviation or air transport undertakings, on vehicles used personally by the minister and by any person given special permission by the minister.

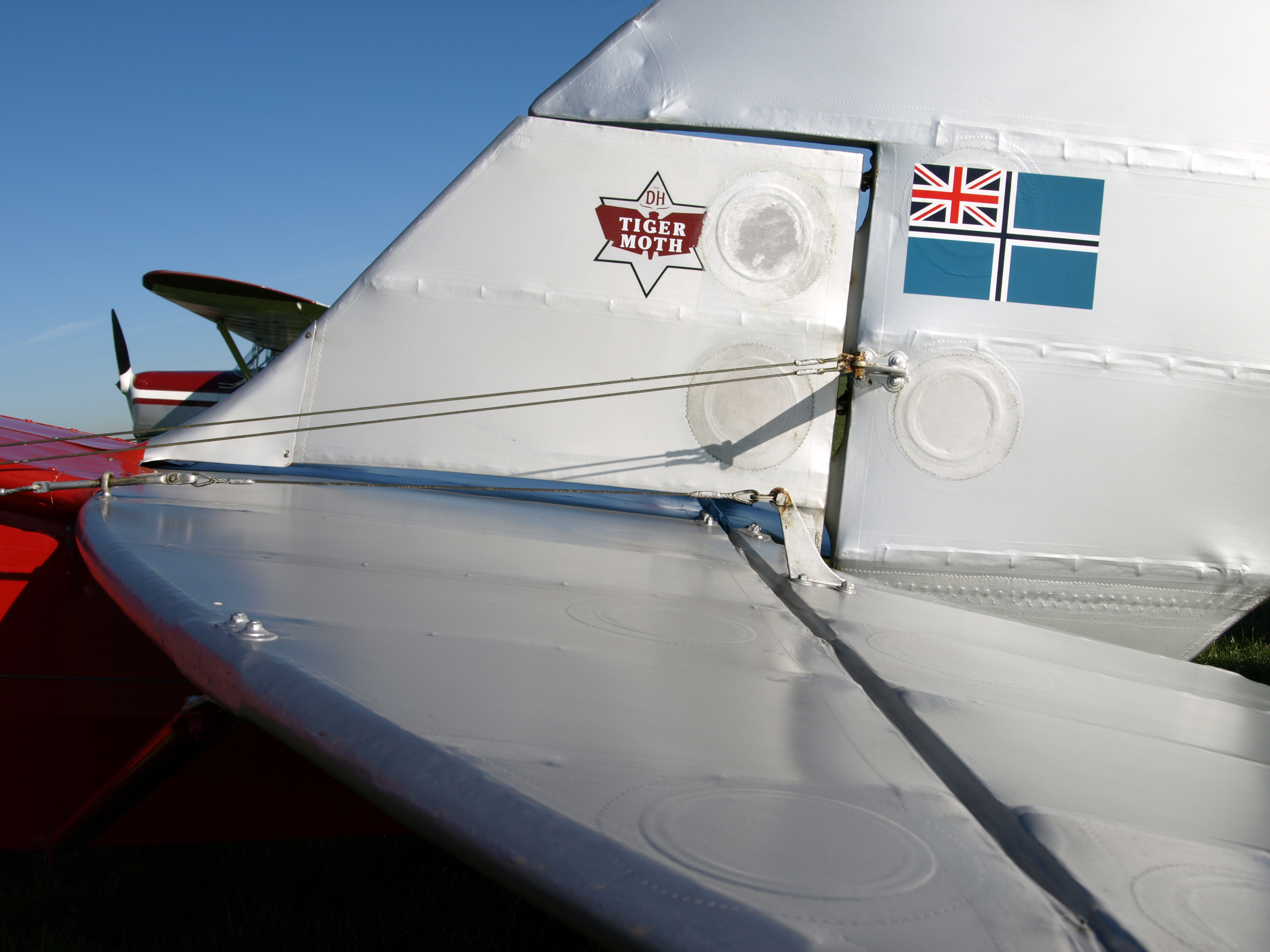
The tail of a de Havilland Tiger Moth showing the civil air ensign on the rudder.

The prototype flag had been made up in silk and was kept throughout World War II by the Civil Aviation Department in a series of locations in London. In October 1948 it was handed to the Ministry of Civil Aviation Library for retention and display. The visible stains on the light blue silk were said to have been caused by water from the fire brigade's hoses used in quelling a fire in the roof at Parliament Square House, caused by a German incendiary bomb, whilst the CAD was accommodated there.

In 1957, a ministry working party reviewing the Air Navigation Order concluded that it was anomalous to regulate the use of the civil air ensign when no special regulations were required to control the use of its maritime equivalent, the Red Ensign. All mention of the civil air ensign was therefore omitted from the Air Navigation Order 1960.

It was part of the livery, as the tail logo, of the Civil Aviation Flying Unit (CAFU) and its predecessors from 1944 to 1982. In 1982 the last two HS 748s were repainted in a CAA corporate blue and white scheme and the civil air ensign was replaced by the Union Flag. The ensign next appeared on the fin of HS 125-700 registration G-UKCA operated by the Civil Aviation Authority from 1987 to 1992 and subsequently by HS 125-700 G-OCAA until 2002.

The British charter airline Ascend Airways used the British Civil Air Ensign on its aircraft, and a stylised version as its logo. The ensign is also displayed on the tail fins of Hebridean Air Services' BN2 Islanders in Scotland.

The British civil air ensign is also the basis for several versions used by other countries.
