= Royal Australian Air Force Ensign =

Flag of the Royal Australian Air Force

- Use: Air force ensign
- Proportion: 1:2
- Adopted: 6 May 1982; 44 years ago
- Design: A field of air force blue with the Union Jack in the canton, the Commonwealth Star below the Union Flag with a clockwise Southern Cross in the fly and an RAAF roundel in the lower fly.
- Use: Air force ensign
- Proportion: 1:2
- Adopted: 1949
- Relinquished: 1982
- Design: A field of air force blue with the Union Jack in the canton, the Commonwealth Star below the Union Flag with the Southern Cross in the fly and an RAF roundel in the lower fly.
- Use: Air force ensign
- Proportion: 1:2
- Adopted: 24 July 1922
- Relinquished: 1948
- Design: A sky blue field defaced with the RAF Roundel and the Union Flag in the canton.

The Royal Australian Air Force Ensign is used by the Royal Australian Air Force and the Australian Air Force Cadets in Australia. It may also be flown on Air Force aircraft overseas. It is based on the Australian national flag, with the field changed to Air Force blue, and the southern cross tilted clockwise to make room for the RAAF roundel (which itself is a modified RAF roundel) inserted in the lower fly quarter. The roundel is a red leaping kangaroo on white within a dark blue ring. The ensign was proclaimed as a flag of Australia under section 5 of the Flags Act on 6 May 1982.

The southern cross is tilted so that Gamma Crucis stays in the same position as for the Australian National Flag and that Alpha Crucis is moved along the x-axis towards the hoist by one-sixth of the width of the flag. This results in the axis being rotated 14.036° clockwise around Gamma Crucis and each star is rotated in this way, although the constellation as a whole is not simply rotated.

== History ==
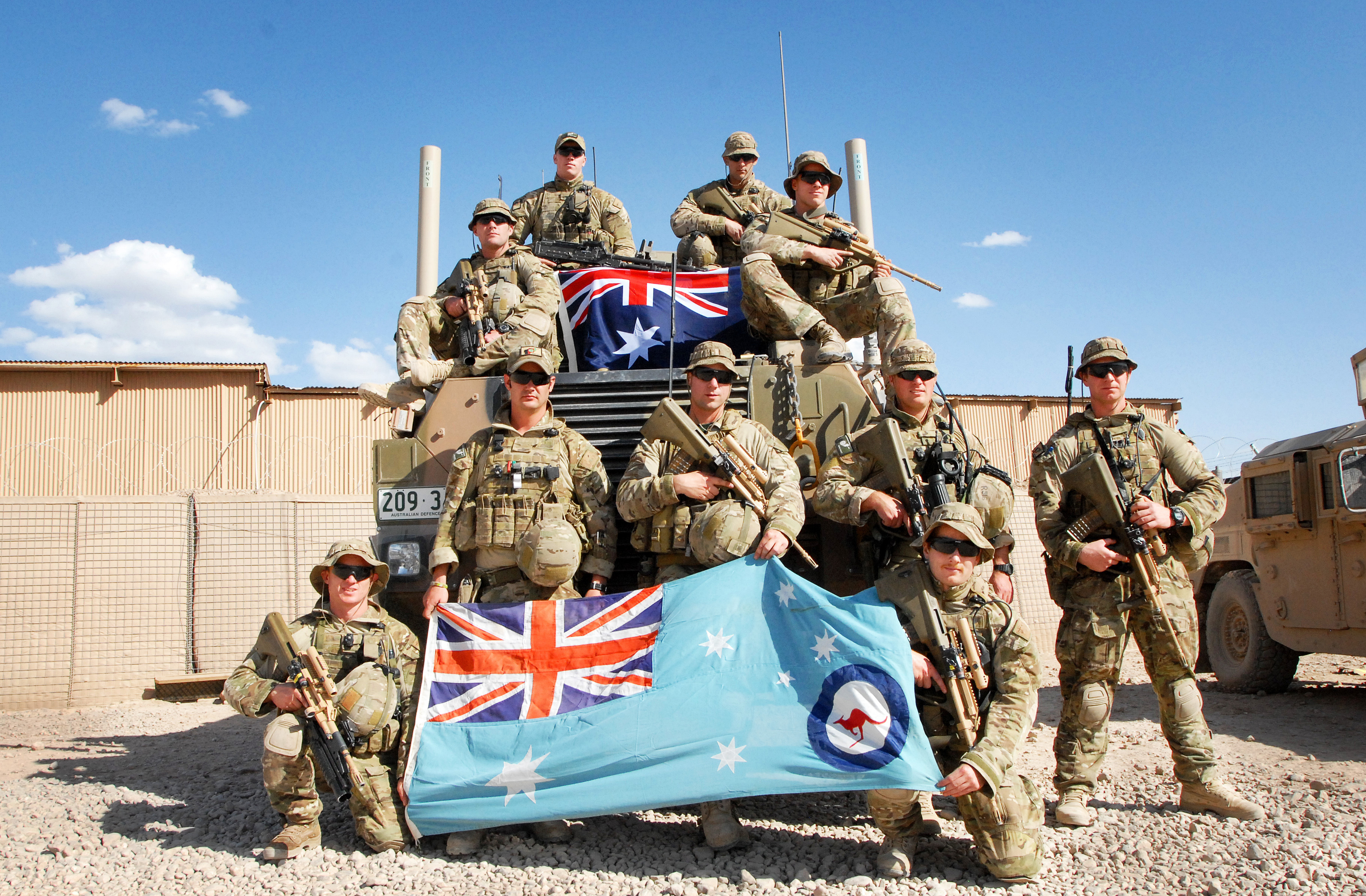
RAAF airfield defence guards posing with the RAAF Ensign and the Australian national flag in Afghanistan

The RAAF was established in 1921. On 24 July 1922, the British Royal Air Force Ensign, a sky-blue British ensign with the RAF roundel in the fly, was approved as the ensign of the RAAF. This flag was used until 1948, when the RAAF asked to change the flag to avoid confusion. A warrant for the new flag, which had the roundel in the lower fly of sky-blue ensign with Commonwealth Star and tilted southern cross to match the Australian national flag, was given in 1949. The RAAF adopted a distinctive roundel on 2 July 1956; a red kangaroo replacing the red circle of the British version. The old roundel remained on the ensign, however, until 1981, when Elizabeth II, who also serves the role as Queen of Australia approved the change to the current flag.

Although the flag is only flown by the RAAF, dispensation was granted to New Lambton Public School, NSW on 18 May 1995 to fly the RAAF ensign. This was in recognition of the school's involvement with the RAAF during World War II, when it was requisitioned by the government and used as No. 2 Fighter Sector Headquarters. New Lambton Public School is currently the only school in Australia with permission to fly the RAAF ensign.

1922–1948

1949–1982

1982–present

== See also ==
- Royal Canadian Air Force Ensign
- Australian flag
- Royal New Zealand Air Force Ensign
- Flags of the Australian Defence Force
