= Defence Force Service Medal =

Australian military service medal

- Obverse of medal (with clasp) Ribbon
- Type: Medal
- Awarded for: a minimum of 15 years "qualifying service", including an assessment of good conduct
- Presented by: Australia
- Eligibility: Members of the Australian Defence Force
- Clasps: every 5 years of additional service beyond the initial 15 years
- Status: Closed, but additional service clasps can still be issued to existing awardees
- Established: 20 April 1982

Highlights
- Total: 119,000
- – 20 years – 25 years – 30 years – 35 years – 40 years – 45 years Ribbon with Rosette(s) (top four), Ribbon with Federation Star (bottom)

Order of Wear
- Next (higher): Centenary Medal
- Next (lower): Reserve Force Decoration (RFD)
- Related: Defence Long Service Medal

The Defence Force Service Medal (DFSM) was an Australian Military award given for long service by permanent members of the Australian Defence Force. It was part of the suite of defence force service awards introduced in 1982, which also included the Reserve Force Decoration (RFD, for officers of the Australian Defence Force Reserves) and the Reserve Force Medal (RFM, for non-commissioned members of the Reserve forces).

All three medals were replaced with effect 20 April 1999 with a single medal, the Defence Long Service Medal, which is now awarded to all permanent and reserve members irrespective of rank.

Additional service clasps are issued for each further 5 years after the initial 15 year qualifying service period. On the ribbon, a rosette indicates the award of each clasp, although a small Federation Star indicates the fifth and subsequent clasps. With the introduction of the Defence Long Service Medal, the DFSM is now a closed award with only clasps to existing awards continuing to be issued.

== Description ==
- The DFSM is a cupro-nickel circular chamfered medal. The obverse has the Joint Service Emblem.
- The reverse is inscribed "For Efficient Service in the Permanent Forces" in capital letters around the circumference.
- The ribbon has three equal stripes of gold and azure-blue edged with azure-blue. The colours were the national colours of Australia at the time of introduction.
- The clasp is a cupro-nickel bar with the Royal Cypher flanked by sprigs of wattle in the centre. When the ribbon is worn alone a clasp is indicated by the addition of a cupro-nickel round rosette, or a silver miniature Federation Star.

== Other Australian long service awards ==
Other Australian long service awards include:

- Reserve Force Decoration (not currently awarded)
- Reserve Force Medal (not currently awarded)
- Defence Long Service Medal
- National Medal
- Australian Cadet Forces Service Medal

Australian Defence Medal

While not awarded for "long service" per se, the Australian Defence Medal is sometimes classified as a "long service medal" – it is intended to recognise all those who completed an obligation to serve their country (whether voluntarily or conscripted).

== See also ==
- Australian Honours Order of Precedence
- Australian Honours System
