= Royal Canadian Air Force Ensign =

Flag of the Royal Canadian Air Force

- Use: Air force ensign
- Proportion: 1:2
- Adopted: 1982; 44 years ago
- Design: A sky blue field defaced with the RCAF Roundel and the Flag of Canada in the canton.
- Use: Air force ensign
- Proportion: 1:2
- Adopted: 1940
- Relinquished: 1965
- Design: A sky blue field defaced with the RCAF Roundel and the Union Flag in the canton.
- Use: Air force ensign
- Proportion: 1:2
- Adopted: 1921
- Relinquished: 1940
- Design: A sky blue field defaced with the RAF Roundel and the Union Flag in the canton

The Royal Canadian Air Force Ensign is the official flag which is used to represent the Royal Canadian Air Force (RCAF). The Ensign has an air force blue field defaced with the Canadian Flag in the canton and the current RCAF roundel in the fly.

== History ==
In 1921, one year after the Canadian Air Force was founded, permission was granted for the Canadian Air Force to use the Royal Air Force Ensign. In February 1921, the Air Officer Commanding the Canadian Air Force, Air Commodore Arthur Tylee, turned his attention to the matter of what might make a suitable flag for the Air Force. In a note he wrote to the Inspector-General of the Canadian Air Force, Air Vice-Marshal Sir Willoughby Gwatkin, Tylee proposed that the RAF Ensign be adopted with a maple leaf at the centre of the roundel. Gwatkin in turn applied to Air Marshal Sir Hugh Trenchard, the British Chief of the Air Staff, who rejected the proposal on the basis that "the sentiment of unity between the Air Services of the Empire" ought to be maintained.

During World War II the question of a specifically Canadian air force flag was raised again and, in July 1940, the Royal Canadian Air Force (RCAF) adopted its own ensign by replacing the red disc at the centre of the RAF Ensign with a red maple leaf. This design remained as the Royal Canadian Air Force Ensign until the Canadian Red Ensign was superseded by the new Canadian National Flag in 1965 and the RCAF ensign ceased to be used officially.

In 1982, the then Canadian Forces Air Command adopted the current flag. The ensign has a field of air force blue like the original RCAF Ensign but the Union Flag was replaced with the Canadian Maple Leaf Flag in the canton and the roundel featured a more stylized maple leaf than the original roundel.
