= Reserve Force Medal =

- Obverse of medal (with bar) and ribbon
- Type: Long Service Medal
- Awarded for: a minimum of 15 years "qualifying service", including an assessment of good conduct
- Presented by: Australia
- Eligibility: Non-commissioned members of the Australian Defence Force Reserves
- Clasps: for each additional 5 years of service
- Status: Not currently awarded, but additional service bars can still be issued to awardees
- Established: 20 April 1982

Highlights
- Total: 12,000
- Ribbon with rosette

Order of Wear
- Next (higher): Reserve Force Decoration (RFD)
- Next (lower): Defence Long Service Medal

The Reserve Force Medal (RFM) was an Australian Military award given for long service by non-commissioned members of the Reserve Forces. It was part of the suite of defence force service awards introduced in 1982, which also included the Defence Force Service Medal (DFSM, for all members of the permanent forces) and the Reserve Force Decoration (RFD, for officers of the Reserve forces).

All three medals were replaced with effect 20 April 1999 with a single medal, the Defence Long Service Medal, which is now awarded to all permanent and reserve members irrespective of rank.

Additional service clasps, each indicating a further 5 years after the initial 15 year qualifying service, can still be issued to persons awarded the RFD, RFM or DFSM. The first four clasps to the medal are indicated by rosettes. These are replaced by a single silver Federation Star for the fifth clasp. Additional Federation Star emblems are added for subsequent clasps.

== Description ==
- The Reserve Force Medal is an oval cupro-nickel medal, ensigned with the Crown of Saint Edward. The obverse has the Joint Service Emblem on a rayed background.
- The reverse is inscribed "For Efficient Service in the Reserve Forces" in capital letters.
- The ribbon is azure blue with gold edges. The colours were the national colours of Australia at the time of introduction.
- The clasp is a cupro-nickel bar with the Royal Cypher flanked by sprigs of wattle in the centre. When the ribbon is worn alone a clasp is indicated by the addition of a cupro-nickel oval rosette or a silver Federation Star.

== Related medals ==
Other Australian long service awards include:

- Defence Force Service Medal (not currently awarded)
- Defence Long Service Medal (not currently awarded)
- National Medal
- Australian Cadet Forces Service Medal

While the Australian Defence Medal is sometimes classified as a "long service medal", it is intended to recognise all those who completed an obligation to serve their country (whether voluntarily or conscripted), and is not awarded for "long service" per se.

== See also ==
- Australian Honours System
- Australian Honours Order of Precedence
