= List of flags of Botswana =

This is a list of flags used in Botswana.

== National flag ==
Flag	Date	Use	Description	Ref.
	1966–present	National flag and ensign	A light blue field with a black central horizontal band with white fimbriation.	

== Government flag ==
Flag	Date	Use	Description	Ref.
	1966–present	Presidential standard	A light blue field with a white black-bordered circle in the centre, bearing the coat of arms of Botswana.	

== Military flags ==
Flag	Date	Use	Description	Ref.
	1977–present	Flag of the Botswana Defence Force		
	?–present	Air force ensign	A green field with a red central stripe fimbriated in white.	

== Political flags ==
Flag	Date	Party	Description	Ref.
	1962–present	Botswana Democratic Party	A horizontal tricolour of white, red, and black.	
	1960–present	Botswana People's Party	A horizontal tricolour of black, yellow, and green with a black star in the central band.	

== Historical flags ==
Flag	Date	Use	Description	Ref.
	1885–1966	Flag of the Bechuanaland Protectorate	The British Union Jack was used as the official flag of the protectorate.	
