= Defence Long Service Medal =

Australian military award

- Obverse of medal (with bar) and ribbon
- Type: Long Service Medal
- Awarded for: a minimum of 15 years "qualifying service", including an assessment of good conduct
- Presented by: Australia
- Eligibility: Members of the Australian Defence Force, including reserves
- Clasps: for each additional 5 years of service
- Status: Currently awarded
- Established: 1998

Highlights
- Total: 33,000
- – 15 years – 20 years – 25 years – 30 years – 35 years – 40 years – 45 years Ribbon with Rosette(s) (top four), Ribbon with Federation Star (bottom)

Order of Wear
- Next (higher): Reserve Force Medal
- Next (lower): National Medal
- Related: Defence Force Service Medal; Reserve Force Decoration (RFD)

The Defence Long Service Medal is an Australian military award given for long service by permanent and reserve members of the Australian Defence Force (ADF), irrespective of rank. It was introduced in 1998, and replaced the suite of ADF service awards introduced in 1982, which comprised the Defence Force Service Medal, the Reserve Force Medal and the Reserve Force Decoration.

It is awarded to personnel who complete 15 years of Regular or Reserve service, or combinations thereof, on or after 14 February 1975. Additional service clasps, each indicating a further 5 years after the initial 15 year qualifying service, are issued. The first four clasps to the medal are indicated by rosettes on the ribbon. These are replaced by a single silver Federation Star for the fifth clasp. Additional Federation Star emblems are added for subsequent clasps.

== Description ==
According to the Australian Department of Defence, the medal is described as:

- The DLSM is a cupro-nickel medal. The obverse has the Joint Service Emblem surrounded by two sprays of wattle leaves and blossom.
- The reverse has a central horizontal panel surrounded by the inscription "For Service in the Australian Defence Force" in capital letters.
- The ribbon has a central panel of seven alternating blue and gold stripes flanked by blue stripes gold edges. The colours and design reflect those of the replaced medals.
- The clasp is a cupronickel bar with the Royal Cypher flanked by sprigs of wattle in the centre. When the ribbon is worn alone a clasp is indicated by the addition of a cupro-nickel round rosette or a silver miniature Federation Star.

== Related medals ==
Other Australian long service awards include:

- Defence Force Service Medal
- Reserve Force Medal
- Reserve Force Decoration
- National Medal (Australia)
- Australian Cadet Forces Service Medal

While the Australian Defence Medal is sometimes classified as a "long service medal", it is intended to recognise all those who completed an obligation to serve their country (whether voluntarily or conscripted), and is not awarded for "long service" per se.

== See also ==
- Australian Honours System
- Australian Honours Order of Precedence
