= Australian Cadet Forces Service Medal =

- Obverse of medal (with bar) and ribbon
- Type: Long Service Medal
- Awarded for: 15 years service
- Presented by: Australia
- Eligibility: officers and instructors in the Australian Defence Force Cadets
- Clasps: every 5 years additional service
- Status: Currently awarded
- Established: 15 December 1999
- First award: 1999

Highlights
- Total: 1,700
- – 15 years – 20 years – 25 years – 30 years – 35 years – 40 years Ribbon with Rosette(s) (top four), Ribbon with Federation Star (bottom)

Order of Wear
- Next (higher): Australian Defence Medal
- Next (lower): Champion Shots Medal
- Related: Cadet Forces Medal (Commonwealth)

The Australian Cadet Forces Service Medal is awarded to recognise long and efficient service by officers and instructors in the Australian Defence Force Cadets. It is awarded for 15 years service. Additional clasps are issued for every 5 years additional service.

The medal is the successor to the Cadet Forces Medal which is awarded by the United Kingdom and New Zealand and ceased to be awarded by Australia in 1974, following the institution of the Australian Honours System.

Recipients of the Australian Cadet Forces Service Medal do not earn an entitlement to use post-nominal letters.

== Description ==
- The Australian Cadet Forces Service Medal features the old Cadet Forces emblem, which is encircled by the words 'Australian Cadet Forces Service Medal'. The medal is cupro-nickel and is ensigned with the Crown of Saint Edward.
- The reverse shows a Federation Star with a central blank panel.
- The 32 millimetre-wide ribbon features vertical stripes of the traditional long service medal colours, gold and azure-blue. This central panel is flanked by stripes of blue, red and navy, which represent links with the Royal Australian Navy, the Australian Army and the Royal Australian Air Force.
- The clasp is a cupro-nickel bar with the Royal Cypher flanked by sprigs of wattle in the centre. When the ribbon is worn alone, the award of a clasp is indicated by the addition of a cupro-nickel round rosette or a silver miniature Federation Star.

== Eligibility ==
The Australian Cadet Forces Service Medal is awarded to Officers and Instructors of the Australian Navy Cadets, Australian Army Cadets and the Australian Air Force Cadets. Time spent on the Un-attached List does not count towards the Australian Cadet Forces Service Medal.

== Related medals ==
Other Australian long service awards include:

- Reserve Force Decoration (RFD)
- Reserve Force Medal
- Defence Force Service Medal
- Defence Long Service Medal
- National Medal

== See also ==
- Australian Honours Order of Precedence
