= National Medal =

National Medal can refer to:

- National Medal (Australia)
- National Medal of Arts
- National Humanities Medal
- National Medal of Science
- National Medal of Technology and Innovation
