= Flags of the Australian Defence Force =

The three branches of the Australian Defence Force are each represented by flags, among other emblems and insignia. Within each service, various symbols fly on individual ships, at bases, camps, the Australian Defence Force Academy and colleges. These include flags, standards, guidons and banners and that denote rank, appointment, corps, formations, regiments, training units and sub-units.

== Service flags ==
The order of precedence when displaying the flags of the Australian Defence Force together is the Australian Defence Force Ensign, the Royal Australian Navy White Ensign followed by the Royal Australian Air Force Ensign. The Australian national flag takes precedence over these and all other Australian flags, with the Australian Army given the role of the ceremonial protector of this flag.

Flag	Date	Use	Description
	1908–present	Australian National Flag. Symbolically defended by the Australian Army.	A Blue Ensign defaced with the Commonwealth Star in the lower hoist quarter and the five stars of the Southern Cross in the fly half
	2000–present	Australian Defence Force Ensign: flag of the ADF	A tricolour of dark blue (navy); red (army) and light blue (airforce) with the triservice badge.
	1967–present	Australian White Ensign: flag of the RAN	A version of the national flag with a white field defaced with a blue Commonwealth Star in the lower canton quarter and a blue Southern Cross in the fly.
	1982–present	Royal Australian Air Force Ensign: flag of the RAAF	The national flag with a light blue field, the Southern Cross tilted and the RAAF roundel (Kangaroo) placed in the lower fly.

== Personal flags ==
The special personages deserving of compliments and automatically entitled to a personal flag include the monarch, the governor-general, state governors, territory administrators, ranking service officers and the minister for defence. The minister and assistant minister for defence are represented by the Australian Defence Force Ensign and use a vertical triband as a carflag featuring panels of dark blue with a modern-style gold anchor, red with crossed swords, and light blue with the wedge-tailed eagle from the RAAF badge.

During the reign of Elizabeth II, Her Majesty's Personal Flag for Australia was approved on 20 September 1962. It replaced the Royal Standard of the United Kingdom for use in Australia during royal tours and on rare occasions overseas, such as the 2003 dedication of the Australian War Memorial in Hyde Park, London.

Flag	Date	Use	Description
	1936–present (Note: The crown has been modified according to the monarch's wishes. From 1936–1963 and from 2024 to present, a tudor crown has been used. From 1963–2024 a St Edward's crown was used.)	Flag of the governor-general of Australia	A crowned lion standing on a crown on a blue field. The crown used is the Tudor Crown.
	2000–present	Personal flag of the Chief of the Defence Force	A horizontal tricolour of dark blue (navy); red (army) and light blue (airforce) with the triservice badge and four gold stars.
	2000–present	Personal flag of the Vice Chief of the Defence Force	A tricolour of dark blue (navy); red (army) and light blue (airforce) with the triservice badge and three gold stars.
	1920–1976, (Note: As the flag of the Australian Naval Board.) 1981– present	Personal flag of the Chief of Navy	A fouled anchor on a red-blue background. Derived from the flag of the British Admiralty.
	1983–Present	King's Colour for the Royal Australian Navy	

== Flags of the Australian Army ==
The order of precedence for the Australian Army is as follows: the Army banner, standards, guidons, the Sovereign's colours, regimental colours and banners. The order of precedence among the various flags that goes: the Army banner; the Banner of Queen Elizabeth II; the Banner of Queen Elizabeth, The Queen Mother; the Banners of the Duke of Edinburgh, Prince Philip; the Banner of Princess Anne; the Banner of Princess Alice and Banners of the Governor-General.

Banners

The first banners issued to Australian units were Union Jacks made of silk in recognition of service during the Boer War. These did not feature a date, cypher or badge as are usually found on banners. Sovereign's banners and those of corps that have the monarch as colonel in chief or captain general are royal blue silk and other banners crimson. In 1956, Lady Gowrie, widow of Australia's tenth governor general, Lord Gowrie VC, offered his baronial banner to the Royal Australian Armoured Corps. It was presented by Governor General Field Marshal Slim during a parade involving squadrons from the 1st Armoured Regiment, 1st/15th Royal New South Wales Lancers and the 8th/13th Victorian Mounted Rifles at Puckapunyal on 15 June 1957. The Military Board decided in 1966 that the officer training unit should have a banner. Governor General Lord Casey gave his approval to its being made the vice-regal banner, presenting it at Scheyville on 8 October 1967. It featured a crimson field with the governor general's insignia and the year 1967 on the obverse. Since then, various elements of the Australian Army have adopted banners, especially following the 1969 publication of Australian Army Military Regulations and Orders (AMR&O) 172, where it was authorised that any corps or unit be entitled to both a Sovereign's banner (including those already having standards, guidons and colours) and training establishments that do not have colours to a governor general's banner. Additionally, any corps not having standards, guidons, or colours may receive a banner from a member of the royal family (other than the monarch) or the governor-general.

On 10 March 2002, there was a parade held at the Australian War Memorial to mark the centenary of the Australian Army. The English red silk Australian Army banner was placed on the Stone of Remembrance before being presented by the governor general, Sir William Deane, and received by the regimental sergeant major of the Army, Pedro Rosemond. It features a gold fringe, gold and crimson cords and tassels and is mounted on a pike with a British royal crest finial. On the obverse, it bears the Coat of arms of Australia and the dates "1901–2001" in gold in the upper hoist. The reverse bears the rising sun badge of the Australian Army along with seven campaign honours on small gold-edged scrolls: South Africa, World War I, World War II, Korea, Malaya-Borneo, South Vietnam, and Peacekeeping. Such presentations continue with the Royal Australian Corps of Transport receiving a banner on 1 June 2013 from Her Royal Highness The Princess Royal as colonel in chief at Amberley.

Corps flags

Flag of the Royal Australian Army Medical Corps

All members of the Australian Defence Force up to the rank of lieutenant colonel are allocated to corps. These flags reflect the various corps colours and, with the exception of the Royal Australian Engineers and the Royal Australian Army Medical Corps, feature the corresponding badge. Not all corps are of sufficient scale and degree of activity to have flags.

The order of precedence for corps is as follows:

- The Corps of Staff Cadets;
- The Royal Australian Armoured Corps;
- The Royal Australian Regiment of Artillery;
- The Royal Australian Engineers;
- The Royal Australian Corps of Signals;
- The Royal Australian Infantry Corps;
- The Australian Army Aviation Corps;
- The Australian Intelligence Corps;
- The Royal Australian Army Chaplains Department;
- The Royal Australian Corps of Transport;
- The Royal Australian Army Medical Corps;
- The Royal Australian Army Dental Corps;
- The Royal Australian Army Ordnance Corps;
- The Royal Australian Army Electrical and Mechanical Engineers;
- The Royal Australian Army Educational Corps;
- The Australian Army Public Relations Service;
- The Australian Army Catering Corps;
- The Royal Australian Army Pay Corps;
- The Australian Army Legal Corps;
- The Royal Australian Army Corps of Military Police;
- The Australian Psychology Corps;
- The Australian Army Band Corps;
- The Royal Australian Army Nursing Corps.

Regimental and battalion flags

Not all regiments and units have adopted flags. State regiments have opted to retain distinguishing colours. The Royal Australian Regiment flag was authorised in 2003 and first paraded on Anzac Day 2004, and there are flags for its nine battalions. There are also various unit and sub-unit flags, including for the 1st Health Support Battalion; 11th Combat Service Support Battalion; 'A' Field Battery, Royal Australian Artillery; 'A' Squadron 10th Light Horse Regiment; Squadron Flag, Royal Australian Corps of Signals and Independent Squadron, Australian Army Aviation Corps.

The order of precedence for Royal Australian Infantry Corps regiments is as follows:

- The Royal Australian Regiment;
- 51st Battalion The Far North Queensland Regiment;
- The Royal Queensland Regiment;
- The Royal New South Wales Regiment;
- The Royal Victoria Regiment;
- The Royal South Australia Regiment;
- The Royal Western Australia Regiment;
- The Royal Tasmania Regiment;
- The Special Air Services Regiment;
- North West Mobile Force;
- The Pilbara Regiment;
- 2nd Commando Regiment;
- 1st Commando Regiment;
- Sydney University Regiment;
- Melbourne University Regiment;
- Adelaide University Regiment;
- Queensland University Regiment;
- Western Australia University Regiment; and
- University of New South Wales Regiment.

== White ensigns ==
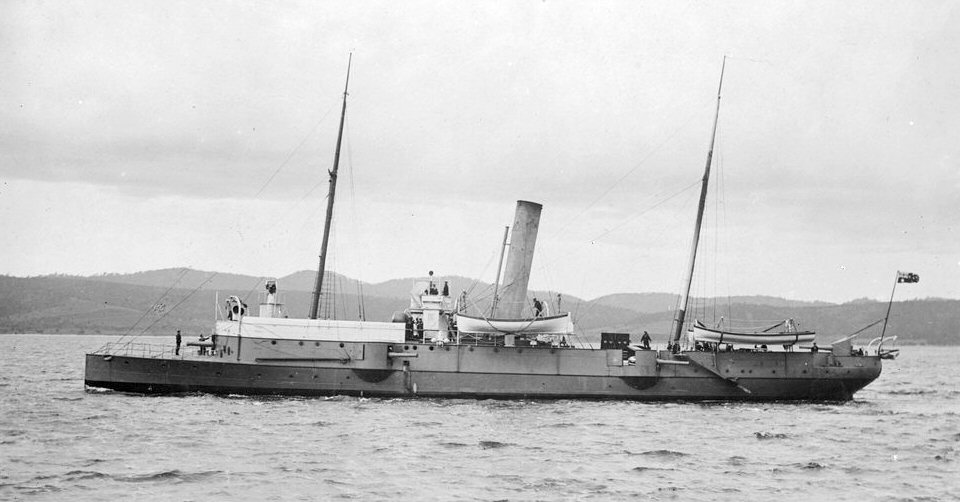
HMCS Protector of the Commonwealth Naval Forces circa 1901.

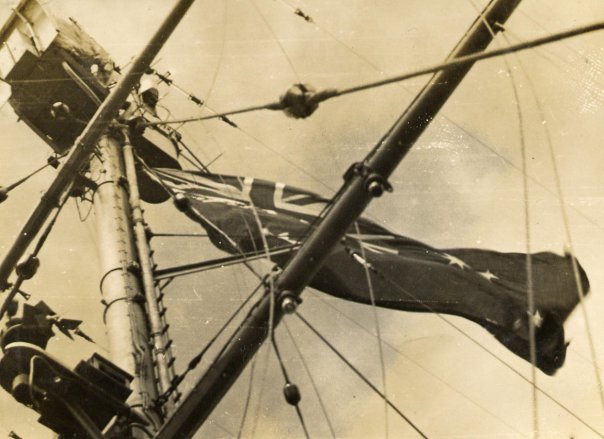
The Australian flag is hoisted as a battle ensign on HMAS Hobart during the invasion of Guadalcanal during World War II.

The pre-federation colonial navies flew British Blue Ensigns defaced with the relevant local badge. Outside of colonial waters, these ships were commissioned into the Royal Navy and used the British White Ensign. In 1901, the colonial navies were integrated into the Commonwealth Naval Forces and consequently flew the Australian flag. Following the formation of the Royal Australian Navy, on 5 October 1911, Naval Order 78/1911 directed all vessels to fly the British White Ensign on the stern and the flag of Australia on the Jackstaff. The Argus newspaper, edition of 29 July 1911, had furthermore carried a notice that the "navy orders that the Australian flag is to be the saluting flag at all reviews and ceremonial parades on shore", with it also being required that the Union Jack is flown at the saluting point "when representatives of His Majesty the King review the Commonwealth forces." However, the practice of RAN captains flying the Union Jack continued, as was the case at a review of HMAS Melbourne at Fremantle in 1913. Following a public demonstration by the Australian Natives Association, the government took action to phase in the 1911 naval regulations. The British White Ensign was finally replaced by a distinctively Australian White Ensign on 1 March 1967. Prior to this time, it was not unknown for RAN captains to fly the Australian flag from the foremast of single-masted ships and the mainmast of two-masted ships as the battle flag when at action stations instead of the Royal Navy white ensign as happened at the battle of the Cocos between HMAS Sydney and the German cruiser SMS Emden.

Royal Australian Navy White Ensign (1967 - )

Royal Navy White Ensign

== Royal Australian Air Force ensigns ==
The Royal Australian Air Force shared the sky blue ensign of their British counterpart from 1922. An Australian variant was adopted in 1948. It featured a tilted southern cross to accommodate the downsized roundel previously occupying the fly-half. The RAAF roundel was last modified in 1982 with the creation of an Australian roundel featuring a stylised leaping red kangaroo in place of the concentric red disk.

The order of precedence for the RAAF is as follows: the Queen's colour for the RAAF, unit Queen's colours, Squadron standards, and the Governor-General's banner. The order of precedence among the various Queen's colours is as follows: the Queen's colour for the RAAF; RAAF School of Technical Training; RAAF academy; RAAF College; Central Flying School; School of Air Navigation; No. 3 Aircraft Depot; No. 1 Flying Training School; No. 1 Aircraft Depot; No. 2 Aircraft Depot and No. 503 Wing.

Royal Australian Air Force Ensign (1982 - )

Royal Australian Air Force Ensign (1948-1982)

Royal Air Force Ensign

== The Australian ensigns at war ==
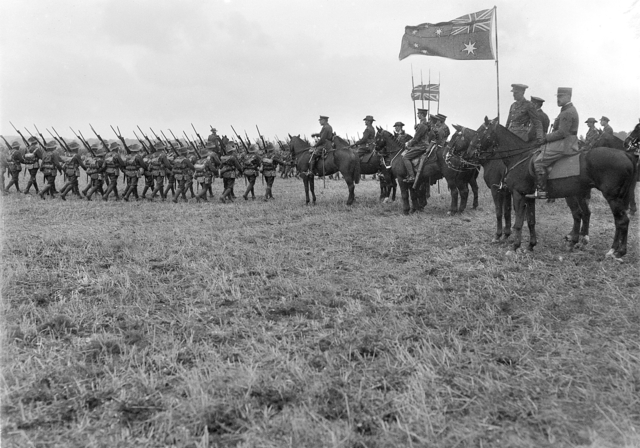
Field Marshal Sir Douglas Haig reviews the 5th Australian Division at Ebblinghem, 29 August 1917. The Australian flag can be seen on the right, and the Union Jack in the background.

In 1908, Australian Army Military Order No 58/08 ordered the blue "Australian Ensign" to replace the Union Jack at all military establishments. From 1911, it served as the saluting flag of the Australian army at all reviews and ceremonial parades (M.O.135), with the Union Jack being reserved for "all occasions when a representative of His Majesty the King reviews the Commonwealth forces" (M.O.391). By traditional British understanding, the blue ensign was reserved for official government use although the red ensign, formerly the popular favourite with the general public, was nevertheless still to be seen in military circulation until after the 1953 legislation, meaning the 1st and 2nd Australian Imperial Forces served under both the blue and red versions.

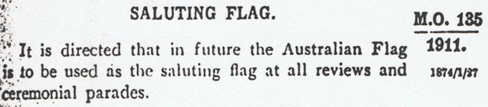
Extract from the Australian Army Military Orders manual.

=== World War I ===
The Australian flag was associated with an act of war for the first recorded time as it flew above the fort at Queenscliff in Victoria, which opened fire to prevent the German steamer Pfalz from leaving port on 6 August 1914. General Birdwood dispatched an Australian flag now on display at the Australian War Memorial to the 15th Infantry brigade with orders that it be flown over Harbonnières, an honour that the commander of the 59th battalion bestowed on the first man to reach the objective, 22-year-old Private Ernest Forty. In 1918, as the 2nd Division entered the Belgian town of Charleroi, the locals turned out to greet them waving Australian flags made out of brown paper bags. The children of Villers-Bretonneux still maintain the tradition of raising the Australian flag in memory of the Australians who died in liberating the area in World War One. The Australian flag was flown above the general headquarters during the Hundred Days Offensive.

=== World War II ===
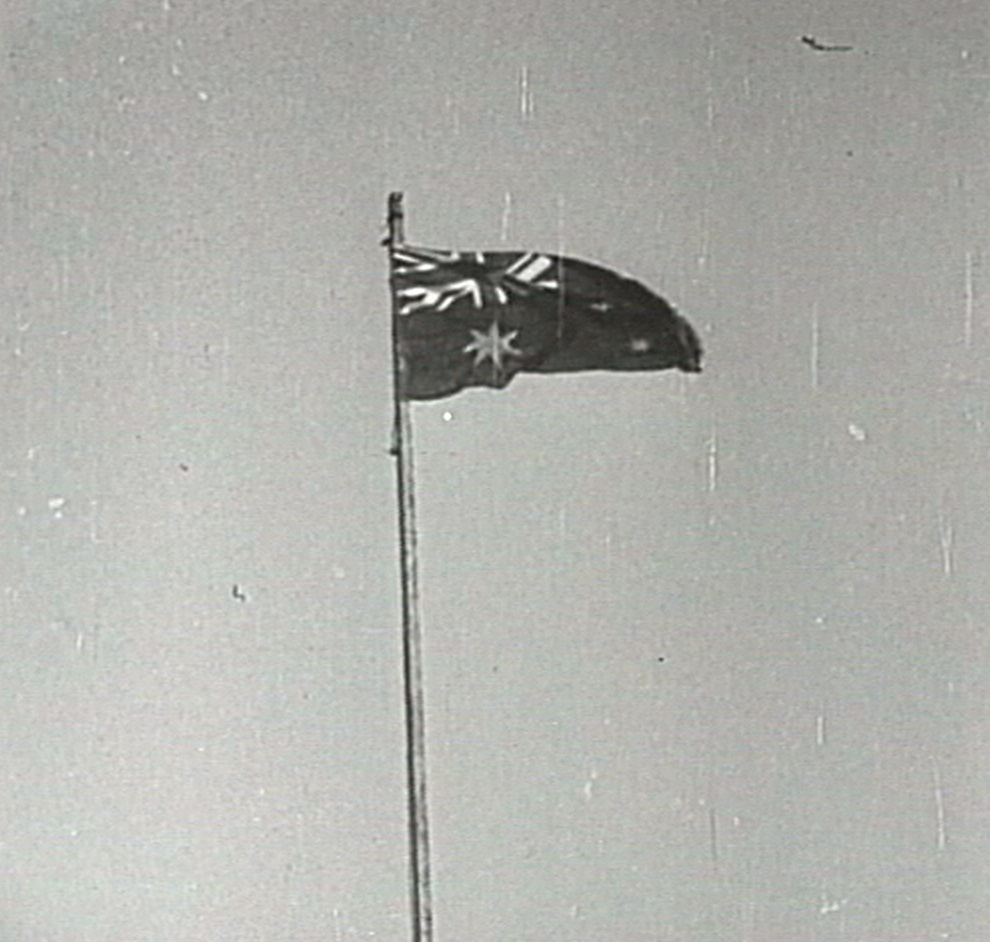
The Australian flag flying after the fall of Lae in World War 2

There were a number of Australian flag raisings in the Pacific and Middle Eastern theatres during the Second World War. It was flown over Kokoda in 1942 and Lae in 1943 where "The Australian flag was hoisted on the pole of the control tower on Lae airfield and American and Australian troops gave victory cheers as the flag floated in the breeze". There has since been a commemorative plaque laid at Lae with the inscription reading: "Here on 16th September 1943 the Australian National Flag was raised by Commander 25th Aust. Inf. Bde to mark the capture of this important base from the Japanese."

On 24 February 1945, The Mail in Adelaide published a photograph under the heading "OUR FLAG ON THE PHILIPPINES" of an Australian flag with the caption stating that: "The first Australian flag to reach the Philippines was draped in front of Australia House, residence of Australian war correspondents. They look very happy about it."

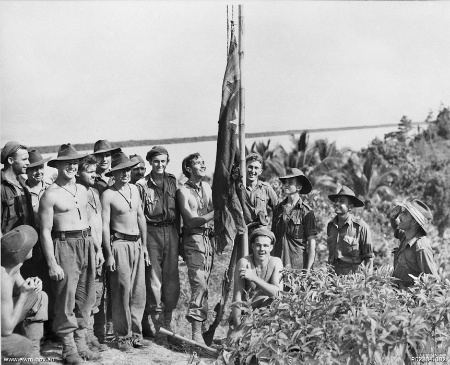
The Australian flag was raised on Linkgas beach during the invasion of Tarakan.

Some of the best-chronicled flag raisings took place during the invasion of Tarakan in May 1945. In the Australian War Memorial collection is a photograph of a flag-raising ceremony that took place after the landing at Lingkas, Tarakan, in the Netherlands East Indies on 1 May 1945, with the caption stating: "Happy soldiers of the 9th Australian Division raise the Australian flag on a bamboo pole on the first day of Operation Oboe One, the Division's successful attack and landing on Tarakan Island then occupied by Japanese forces."

It was also reported on 8 May 1945 in the Melbourne Argus under the headline "AUSTRALIANS CAPTURE TARAKAN AIRSTRIP: Victorian Battalion in Thick of Fight" that, after using tanks as mobile artillery in a struggle that lasted over five days:

That night the troops who had won the air strip enjoyed their first night's unbroken rest since they landed on the island at dawn on Tuesday. They forgot their weariness, their sweat-sodden clothes, and unshaven faces, in the cheer they gave as they watched the Australian flag and their own battalion emblem being hoisted over the strip.

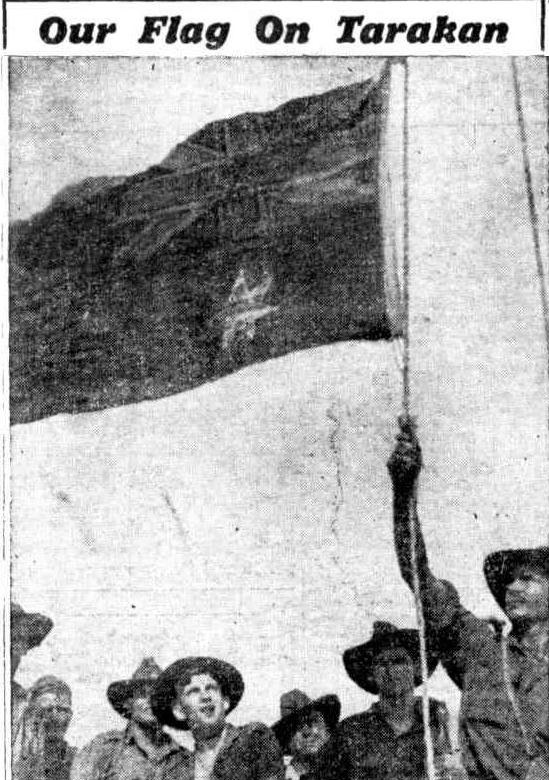
Lieutenant K. McKitrick raising the Australian flag after victory in the battle of Tarakan in world war 2

At the end of the battle of Tarakan the Perth Sunday Times Lieutenant K. McKitrick appeared on the front page of the 20 May 1945 edition, raising the Australian flag on Sadau Island under the headline "OUR FLAG ON TARAKAN" with the caption reading: "A.I.F. VETERANS of the 9th Division fly an Australian flag on Tarakan Island (Borneo) on which, today's cables say, they have achieved their objectives."

At the 1946 London Victory Parade there were Australian flags strung across the thoroughfare and carried by the Australian Contingent. It is featured along with the flags of allied nations in a portrait commissioned by the Australian War Memorial to mark the occasion. There was also a report of the Australian flag being flown over Japan in April 1946 along with other Commonwealth of Nations flags.

=== Korean and Vietnam Wars ===
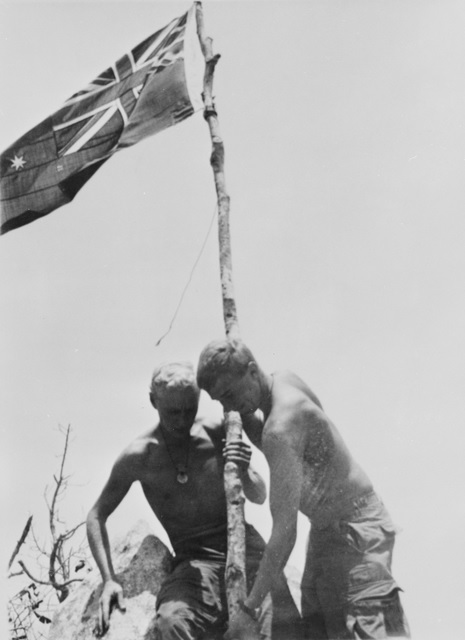
The Australian flag is raised on Hill 323. After the Viet Cong proceeded to erect a battle flag nearby, the battalion HQ received a request for ground clearance from a US warship lying off the shore to enable them to open fire on the enemy position.

The first Australian flag to fly in Pyongyang during the Korean War was hoisted by Lieutenant W.L. Brodie OC of the Australian Visitors and Observers Section over a dwelling that had previously been occupied by the Mongolian Embassy to North Korea.

During the Vietnam War, the headlines "Hill 323 Under Aust. Control" and "Australian flag over base" appeared in a Sydney Morning Herald report dated 23 March 1968 stating that task force troops Lance Corporal David Halliday and Private John Scott had "wedged the Australian flag in a clump of rocks on Hill 323 in the middle of an abandoned Vietcong supply base." In the Australian War Memorial collection is a photograph of Warrant Officer Class One Jim Geedrick, an Indigenous serviceman from Rockhampton who was an adviser with the 1st Battalion, 2nd Regiment of the South Vietnamese Army, raising the Australian flag on Anzac Day 1969, after missing the ceremony held at Da Nang held by the Australian Army Train Team, Vietnam. According to Geedrick, such displays were rare as "every time I put the flag up they shoot holes through it." At the 1965 memorial for Kevin "Dasher" Wheatley, after making his last stand in the Vietnam war that earned him a posthumously awarded Victoria Cross, a South Vietnamese officer would pin a valour medal to the Australian flag covering his casket upon which was placed a wreath.

== Other flags associated with military forces in Australia ==
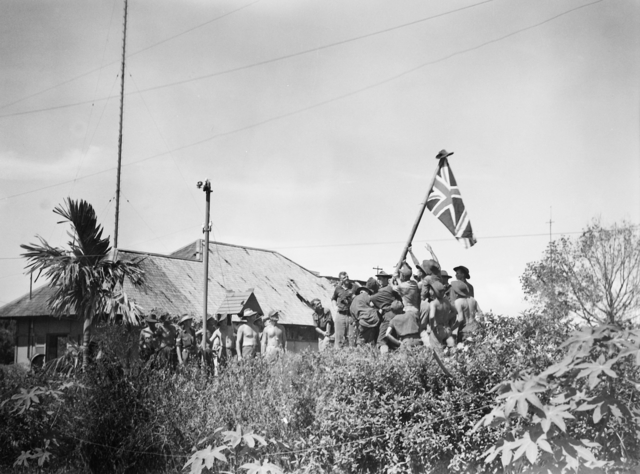
The Union Jack is raised outside a supply depot of the 9th Australian division on Tarakan, 2 May 1945.

There have been other flag designs and individual specimens that have historically been associated with the Australian Defence Force and the former British colonial forces in Australia. There was no distinguishing flag for Australia until the 1901 Federal Flag Design Competition, and the various pre-federation military forces used British and local colonial flags up until the Boer War. In 1802, there was an incident where the third governor of New South Wales, Philip Gidley King (1758–1808), ordered Lieutenant Charles Robbins, RN, to set out from Sydney in a tiny armed schooner, the Cumberland, with a crew of seventeen in search of a French surveying expedition. The French were finally encountered on 14 December on King Island. As the naturalists were busy collecting insect and plant samples, Robbins landed, and his party marched to the back of the French camp. He then posted three men in front of a tree who, upon the Union Jack being raised, fired three volleys and gave three cheers before it was audibly announced that the island was a possession of His Majesty King George III.

The Australian Army's oldest battle honour dates from Suakin in 1885. It was originally an honorary distinction granted by King Edward VII in 1907 to the 1st, 2nd and 3rd Australian infantry regiments. Their colonial predecessors, the 1st, 2nd and 3rd regiments of the New South Wales contingent, had essentially constituted the infantry contingent from that colony in the Sudan war. This honour was subsequently passed to the 1st battalion (The East Sydney Regiment), 3rd battalion (The Werriwa Regiment), 17th battalion, and 20th battalion (The Parramatta and Blue Mountains Regiment). This honour is now held by their present-day descendant, the Royal New South Wales Regiment.

=== British colonial forces and militia ===
The first surviving reference to military colours in Australia was by Mary Easty, in connection with Major Grose being sworn in as Lieutenant-Governor of New South Wales, who wrote that: "the Colour of the N.S.Wails [Corps] was Displaeyed for the first time on this Ground." Only one British unit stationed in the colonies, the 39th (Dorset) regiment, has been identified as receiving colours which were presented by Governor Darling on 16 May 1831. There were eighteen locally raised units to receive colours prior to Federation. It appears the first such ceremony took place on 20 June 1855 at the Sydney Domain, involving a flag or banner rather than colours being presented to the Volunteer Force of New South Wales.

- In the collection of the Power House Museum in Sydney, there is what appears to be a banner that features the royal cypher of King George IV, which is embroidered with the words "Royal New South Wales Veteran Corps", which arrived in the colony in 1826.
- The Australian War Memorial holds the regimental colour of the Richmond Company of the Victorian Volunteer Rifles Corps that was presented at the Richmond cricket ground on 2 February 1862.
- On 30 September 1861, the Buckingham Rifles were presented colours at the Hobart Domain that are now on display at the Tasmanian Museum and Art Gallery.
- The Bathurst Volunteer Rifles were presented with colours by the Countess of Belmore, wife of Governor the Earl of Belmore, also in attendance at the ceremony held on 3 June 1869, that are now under preservation at the Bathurst Museum.

=== Boer War ===
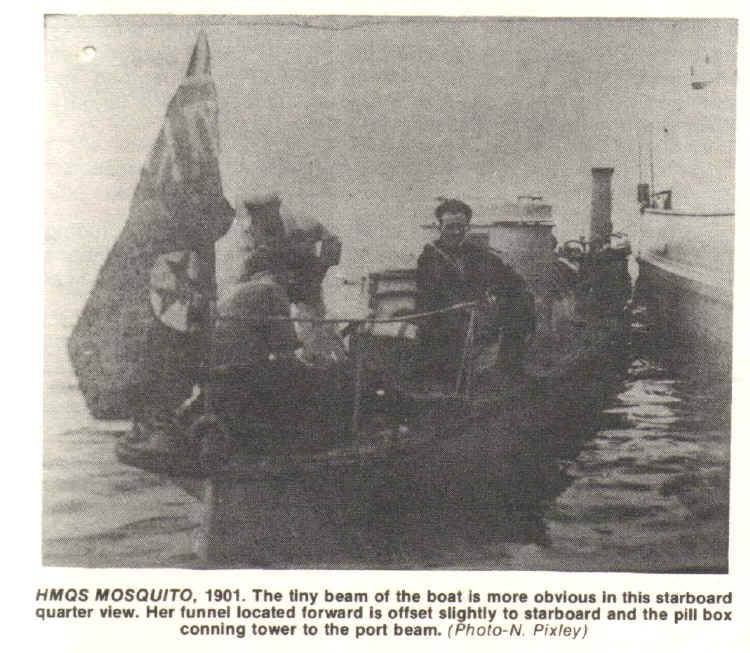
HMQS Mosquito flying the Queensland flag circa 1901.

The Australian colonies all dispatched contingents to fight in the Boer War. The Imperial government acknowledged this service by issuing a number of colours, also known as honourable insignia or King's banners, being Union Jacks made of silk.

- The King's banner presented to the New South Wales Lancers is under preservation at the Lancers' Linden House Museum.
- There is a photograph of a flag covering the grave of Breaker Morant in Pretoria, South Africa, during the Boer War in 1901 that is believed to have been the predominately red ensign.

=== 1st Australian Imperial Force ===
There are a number of Union Jacks, Australian ensigns and regimental banners associated with the first world war still under preservation at the Australian War Memorial, Imperial War Museum and in other collections.

- According to Corporal Edward Watson, the first Australian flag taken to the western front during the First World War was a red ensign he received from Prime Minister Billy Hughes as a departing gift to the Imperial reserves. It was present at the Battle of Mons where there were reports German forces were held up at a crucial time as a result of the appearance of the Angels of Mons.
- The Australian War Memorial holds the Australian flag that was raised along with the Union Jack by the Australian Naval and Military Expeditionary Force at Kawieng, New Ireland, in September 1914.
- Also under preservation is the Australian flag carried by General Monash's lance bearer in the 1919 London Victory Parade.

Maitland has noted that "postcards were hugely used during the Great World War and often displayed Australia's National Flag" with the Polygon Wood scene by Alfred Pearse sold to raise money for the Australian Comforts Fund. It was inspired by an event that actually took place during the battle of the Menin Road on 20 September 1017 where message was sent "Consolidating objective. Australian flag flying on Anzac House." Kwan has concluded the scene also contains artistic license in that the flag itself was constructed of paper measuring 7.5 cm x 10 cm and struck to a can of bully beef that was "blown to pieces by a shell later that day." The event was reenacted at an Australian National Flag Day eve ceremony held in Martin Place, Sydney.

==== Gallipoli flags ====
- The first flag to be carried ashore by the 1st AIF during the Gallipoli landings was the banner of the 12th Battalion 3rd Brigade, which has been restored and is now on permanent display at the Imperial War Museum in London.
- The University of Queensland's Emmanuel College has an Australian flag that was taken to Gallipoli and France by Reverend E.N. Merrington. Following the armistice, it was flown over the Australian General Headquarters.
- There is also an apparently bullet-ridden Australian flag on display at the Geraldton RSL club that returned to Australia after being taken to Gallipoli and France.
- Once on display at the now-closed Adamstown RSL was a red ensign believed to have been taken by a local soldier to Gallipoli.
- There is a small printed cotton red ensign in the Australian War Memorial collection that was taken to Gallipoli by Sergeant Percy Earnest Virgoe, who served in the 4th Light Horse regiment.
- There is a Union Jack on display at Christ Church Cathedral in Newcastle that was presented to the 13th battalion on behalf of the Ulster Association of New South Wales and flown at Gallipoli.
- At St Barnabas' Church of England in Fairfield is an army-issued Union Jack bearing a full circle of green leaves edged with a yellow thread in the centre on a dark ground. Inside the wreath are the initials G.V.A., with the letters G and A being intertwined in yellow thread. This device is surmounted by a crown also in yellow thread. The accompanying plaque reads: "This flag was recovered from General Birdwood's Headquarters by Cpl. A.H. Thomas, 12th Australian Light Horse, at the evacuation of Gallipoli on the 18th December, 1915 and presented to St Barnabas' Church of England, Fairfield, as a memorial. 29.7.62.".
- There was a ceremony Australian War Memorial on 11 April 2000 where Alec Campbell, the last surviving Gallipoli veteran, symbolically presented an Australian flag to a serving member of the Australian Defence Force. It remains under preservation in Canberra and has been raised at Gallipoli every Anzac Day since.

=== 2nd Australian Imperial Force ===
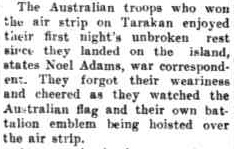
An extract from a report of the flag raising ceremony at Tarakan airfield during the Second World War.

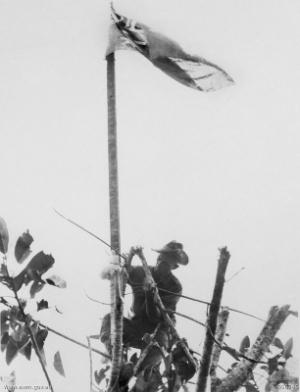
The hero of the battle of Sattelberg Tom Derrick has the honour of raising the Australian red ensign after the action for which he was later awarded the Victoria Cross in 1943.

There are a variety of Australian military flags dating from the Second World War still on permanent display to the public being held by the Australian War Memorial, the Melbourne Shrine of Remembrance, other institutions and private collections.

- The Australian flag flying outside the residence of the Administrator of the Northern Territory, Charles Abbott, during the 19 February 1942 Japanese bombing raid on Darwin became the first to be damaged on home soil and is now on public display at the Australian War Memorial. In 1946 it was displayed alongside the blue ensigns which had flown at Villers-Bretonneux in 1917 and onboard HMAS Sydney during her victory over the Italian cruiser Bartolomeo Colleoni in 1940 for the peace treaty ceremonies.
- The Bega Pioneers Museum holds two red ensigns that were at Gallipoli and the siege of Tobruk. The latter has been signed by over 200 personnel and it is thought that these ceremonies took place aboard a troop ship.
- An Australian flag believed to have been used by the 2/23rd battalion and raised at Linkgas beach was discovered during a pause for the national salute appeal after being featured on an Australian Flag Society (AFS) Facebook promotional logo.

==== POW camp flags ====
In 1945, at the end of the war, there were multiple reports of Australian flags being made in prisoner-of-war camps. In one such report dated 18 June 1945, the Canberra Times correspondent on Labuan Island stated that after the Australians in the camp were liberated, there were found "a few knapsacks, some old boots, and photographs, also an Australian flag." According to Maitland, there are at least four POW flags associated with Changi prison on Singapore Island still under preservation.

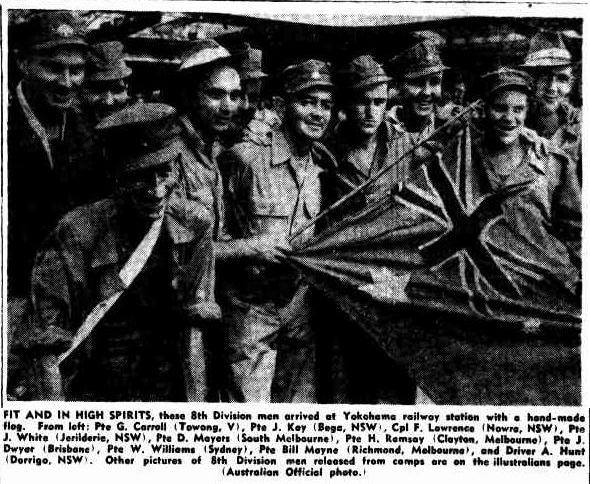
This POW flag appeared on the front page of the Argus newspaper, 15 September 1945 edition.

- There was a POW camp flag from Naoetsu that was hand-sewn from pieces of coloured parachutes used to drop supplies to the Australians whilst still detained by the Japanese.
- The first Australian flag to fly over Singapore after news of the imminent Japanese surrender was received in August 1945 is held by the Australian War Memorial.
- According to an eyewitness statement, also in August 1945, there was an Australian flag that had been concealed by an Australian prisoner "raised over a group of skeletal sick Australians in a Japanese POW camp in Thailand and all wept unashamedly." There is an entry for a POW flag held by the Australian War Memorial from the number 8 camp in Saigon.
- There is another photograph of ex-POWs displaying an Australian flag constructed while they were in captivity as published on the front page of the Argus, edition of 15 September 1945.
- In the foyer of the Essendon Civic Centre, there is an Australian flag on display that was originally presented to the 2/2nd Pioneer Battalion at Puckapunyal by the mayor of Essendon. It was used as a burial flag for members of the battalion after they became prisoners of war in 1942 when the Allied forces capitulated in Java.
- Another Australian flag said to have originated in Changi is on display at the Heritage Lodge, being unveiled at a ceremony in 2008 attended by ex-Changi prisoner Henry Cook, who believes the specimen was constructed after his stay of several months in the camp and was quoted as saying "We suffered for that flag."
- The Returned and Services League holds the Strawbridge red ensign that is said to have been used as a POW flag at Changi prison.
- At the Melbourne Shrine of Remembrance, there is a Union Jack on display that was used as a POW and burial flag in Changi prison. Donated in 2004 by Ron and Barbara Walker, it was unveiled in the Hall of Commons on 11 February 2005. It flew over the Sultan's palace in Jahore, located in southern Malaya, until 1941 when it was removed by Captain Ken Parsons of the 2/3rd Motor Ambulance Convoy, as the Japanese Imperial Army advanced during World War II. Prisoners at Changi retained the flag after the fall of Singapore, breaking it out for funerals and other ceremonial occasions. During the years 1942-1945, the flag was defaced with over one hundred signatures, of which 91 were Australians, including 33 Victorians, 36 New South Welshmen, 16 Queenslanders and 2 Western Australians. The remainder may be members of the liberating forces and the foreign patients of Australian medical units with one message saying "Xmas 1942. Wishing Capt Parsons speedy release and everything good for the coming year. From the patients."
- In 2024, it was reported in the Corryong Courier that the AFS had discovered an Australian red ensign bearing the words "Changi '41 '42" and "Chitty flag", which may have flown over the Changi AFL game where prisoner of war Peter Chitty won the "Changi brownlow medal" that is on display at the Australian War Memorial. Also found were a leather football and whistle with the inscription "Changi Football League", along with a basketball bearing the words "Changi Basketball League".

== Bibliography ==
- Australian Flags (3rd ed.). Canberra: Australian Government Publishing Service. 2006. ISBN 0-642-47134-7.
- Bose, Romem (2005), The End of the War: Singapore's Liberation and the Aftermath of the Second World War, Singapore: Marshall Cavendish Editions
- Cayley, Frank (1966). Flag of Stars. Adelaide: Rigby. ISBN 978-9-04-010451-0.
- Cayley, Frank (1980). Flag of Stars (2nd ed.). Adelaide: Rigby.
- Goodman, Rupert (1998). Don't change our flag: An exposure of false and misleading arguments. Tingalpa: Boolorong Press.
- Kwan, Elizabeth (2006). Flag and Nation: Australians and their National Flags since 1901. Sydney: University of New South Wales. ISBN 0-86840-567-1.
- Maitland, Gordon (2015). The story of Australia's flags: Our flags, standards, guidons, colours, banners, battle honours and ensigns. Pymble: Playbill Printworks. ISBN 9780992515416.
- Odgers, George (1989). Navy Australia: An Illustrated History. Frenchs Forest: Child and Associates.
