= Centenary Medal =

Australian commemorative medal

- Type: Medal
- Awarded for: Citizens and other people who made a contribution to Australian society or government, including centenarians
- Presented by: Australia
- Status: Closed
- Established: 14 February 2001

Highlights
- Total: 15,846; 1,400 (centenarians)

Order of Wear
- Next (higher): Australian Sports Medal
- Next (lower): Defence Force Service Medal

The Centenary Medal is an award which was created by the Australian Government in 2001. It was established to commemorate the centenary of the Federation of Australia and to recognise "people who made a contribution to Australian society or government". It was also awarded to centenarians, Australian citizens born on or before 31 December 1901 who lived to celebrate the centenary of federation on 1 January 2001. Nominations were assessed by a panel chaired by historian Geoffrey Blainey.

== Medal ==
=== Design ===
The obverse of the medal features a seven-pointed Commonwealth Star representing the six Australian states, with the seventh point representing Australia's territories. At the centre of the star is an Indigenous styling of Aboriginal traditions at the heart of the continent. Around the rim are 100 dots depicting 100 years of federation. The reverse features a seven pointed star, with the words "For Contribution Made to Australian Society" around the rim.

=== Bar and ribbon ===
The colours in the ribbon are crimson, which represents federation, and blue and gold for the beginning of the 21st century. The seven gold and red lines signify the states' pathways to federation. The bar and ribbon are the same so that a recipient can be identified as such.
