= Air force ensign =

Official flag of an air force

An air force ensign is a flag used by a national air force.

With the creation of independent air forces in the first half of the 20th century, a range of distinguishing flags and ensigns were adopted. Such flags may often feature a roundel in the national colours.

Notable examples include:

- Royal Air Force Ensign
- Royal Australian Air Force Ensign
- Royal Canadian Air Force Ensign
- Royal New Zealand Air Force Ensign
- Indian Air Force Ensign
- Rhodesian Air Force Ensign

== Current air force ensigns ==
Australia

Bangladesh

Belgium

Brunei

Canada

China

Colombia

Egypt

India

Israel

Jamaica

Jordan

Kenya

Lithuania

Malaysia

Montenegro

Myanmar

Namibia

New Zealand

Nigeria

Norway

Oman

Pakistan

Poland

Qatar

Saudi Arabia

Saudi Arabia (other variant)

South Africa

Sri Lanka

Sudan

United Kingdom

Yemen

Zimbabwe

== Historic air force ensigns ==
Australia (1922-1948)

Australia (1948-1982)

Belgium (1940-1944)

Canada (1921-1940)

Canada (1941-1968)

Egypt (1922-1958)

United Arab Republic (1958-1972)

India (1945-1947)

India (1950-2023)

Burma (1948-1974)

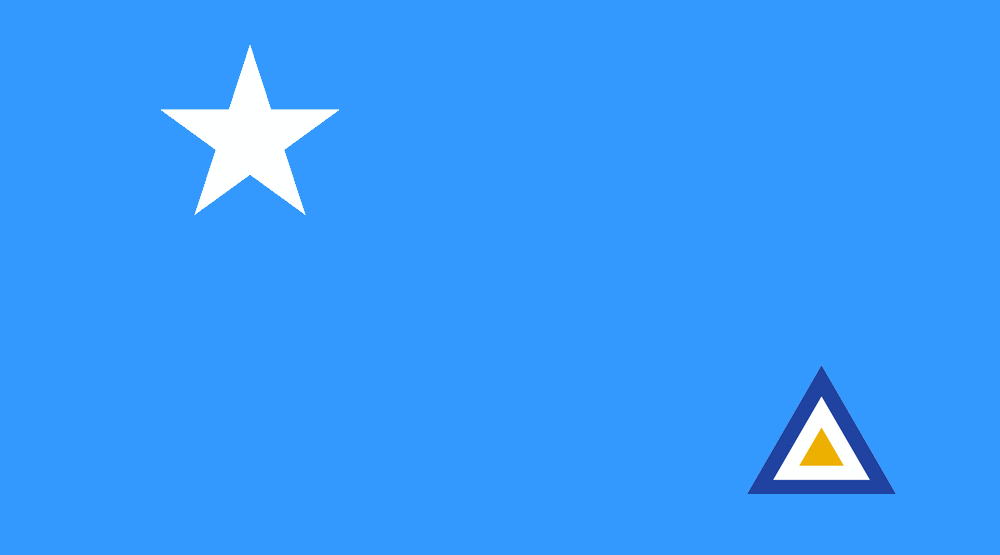
Burma & Myanmar (1974-2010)

Rhodesia (1953-1963)

Rhodesia (1964-1970)

Rhodesia (1970-1979)

Zimbabwe-Rhodesia (1979)

South Africa (1920-1940)

South Africa (1940-1951)

South Africa (1951-1958)

South Africa (1958-1967) (1970-1981)

South Africa (1967-1970) (Never used)

South Africa (1981-1982)

South Africa (1982-1994)

South Africa (1994-2003)

Ceylon (1951-1972)

Sri Lanka (1972-2010)

Syria (1980-2024)

== Air force flags ==
Some countries, such as the United States, designate their national air force standards as flags not ensigns. See the Flag of the United States Air Force for an example.
