= Royal New Zealand Air Force Ensign =

Flag of the Royal New Zealand Air Force

- RNZAF Ensign
- Proportion: 1:2
- Adopted: The Royal New Zealand Air Force
- Design: A sky blue field with the Union Flag in the canton and the RAF Roundel in the fly

The Royal New Zealand Air Force Ensign is the official flag which is used to represent the Royal New Zealand Air Force. The ensign has a field of air force blue with the Union Jack in the canton and the Royal New Zealand Air Force's roundel in the middle of the fly. It is based on the British Royal Air Force Ensign with the letters "NZ" superimposed in white over the red central disc of the roundel.
