= Canton (flag) =

Rectangular area of a flag

A 2:3 Canton.

In vexillography, the canton is a rectangular emblem usually placed in the upper hoist of a flag, usually occupying up to a quarter of a flag's area. The canton of a flag may be a flag in its own right. For instance, British ensigns have the Union Jack as their canton, as do their derivatives such as the national flags of Australia and New Zealand.

Following the practice of British ensigns, a canton sometimes contains a symbol of national unity, such as the blue field and white stars of the flag of the United States of America. In these cases, the canton may be called simply the union.

The American flag's canton derives from Britain's use of the Union Jack in the flags of its possessions (including, historically, the Thirteen American Colonies). Subsequently, many New World nations (along with other later countries and regions, such as Liberia or Malaysia) that were inspired by the United States adopted flag elements that were inspired by the American flag. As a result, many extant uses of a prominent canton derive either from British territorial history, or American influence and inspiration.

== Upper hoist cantons ==
=== Current flags and Ensigns using cantons ===
==== Sovereign states ====
The flag of Australia features the Union Jack as a canton.

The flag of Chile incorporates a blue canton bearing a white five-pointed star.

The flag of Greece has a blue canton with a white Greek cross.

The flag of Liberia has a blue canton with a white five-pointed star. (This flag's canton is also used as Liberia Naval Jack/Jack of Liberia).

The flag of Malaysia has a canton with a crescent and 14-pointed star in yellow on a blue field.

The flag of New Zealand has a Union Jack canton.

The flag of Samoa has a blue canton which bears the Southern Cross constellation in white.

The flag of the Republic of China has a navy blue canton bearing a white sun with 12 triangular rays. (This flag's canton is also used as the naval jack and the flag of the Kuomintang.)

The flag of Togo has a red canton bearing a white five-pointed star.

The flag of Tonga has a white canton bearing a red Greek cross couped.

The flag of Tuvalu features the Union Jack in its canton.

The flag of the United States has 50 white five-pointed stars on a blue canton (a.k.a. union), standing for the country's 50 constituent states (This flag's canton is also used as United States Naval Jack/Jack of the United States).

The flag of Uruguay has a white canton charged with the Sun of May.

==== Territories, regions, states, and provinces ====
===== States of Australia =====
All of the Australian states (although not the territories) use the UK's national flag in their cantons.

New South Wales

South Australia

Tasmania

Queensland

Victoria

Western Australia

===== Provinces of Canada =====
Two of Canada's ten provinces use flags with cantons, both the UK national flag.

Manitoba

Ontario

===== Counties of Liberia =====
Every county flag of Liberia contains the Liberian national flag in its canton.

Bomi County

Bong County

Gbarpolu County

Grand Bassa County

Grand Cape Mount County

Grand Gedeh County

Grand Kru County

Lofa County

Margibi County

Maryland County

Montserrado County

Nimba County

Rivercess County

River Gee County

Sinoe County

===== Overseas Territories of the United Kingdom =====
The flag of Anguilla features a blue Ensign with the coat of arms of Anguilla in the fly.

The flag of Bermuda features a red Ensign with the coat of arms of Bermuda in the fly.

The flag of the British Indian Ocean Territory features a Blue Ensign with 7 wavy white stripes, with a palm tree on the hoist side and a crown over it.

The flag of the British Virgin Islands features a blue ensign with the Union flag in the top left hand corner and the coat of arms centre-right.

The flag of the Cayman Islands features a British blue ensign with the coat of arms of the Cayman Islands in the fly.

The flag of the Falkland Islands features a Blue Ensign with the coat-of-arms of the Falkland Islands in the fly.

Flag of Saint Helena in the United Kingdom, has the UK's flag in its canton.

===== Other =====
The flag of Abkhazia features a red canton with a white right hand and seven white stars on it.

The flag of the autonomous province of Adjara contains the Georgian flag in the canton.

The flag of Amazonas in Brazil

The flag of Azad Kashmir

The flag of Bahia in Brazil

Flag of The Balearic Islands, an autonomous community within the Kingdom of Spain.

Flag of Brittany in France, inspired by the American and Greek flags

Flag of the French Southern and Antarctic Lands has a rare use of the flag of France as its canton.

The flag of Georgia has the state coat of arms in the canton, surrounded by 13 stars which, like the stripes on the US flag, represent the original 13 colonies.

Goiás in Brazil

Flag of Guatemala Department of Guatemala contains its coat of arms.

The flag of Hawaii has the UK's flag in its canton.

Flag of Johor in Malaysia, which contains the Islamic star and crescent in the canton, as does the national flag

The flag of Maranhão in Brazil

The flag of Melaka in Malaysia has a charge, of the Islamic star and crescent.

Flag of Negeri Sembilan in Malaysia, the canton of which resembles the flag of Papua New Guinea

The flag of Piauí in Brazil

Flag of the United Tribes of New Zealand

The flag of Sabah in Malaysia contains a profile of local Mount Kinabalu.

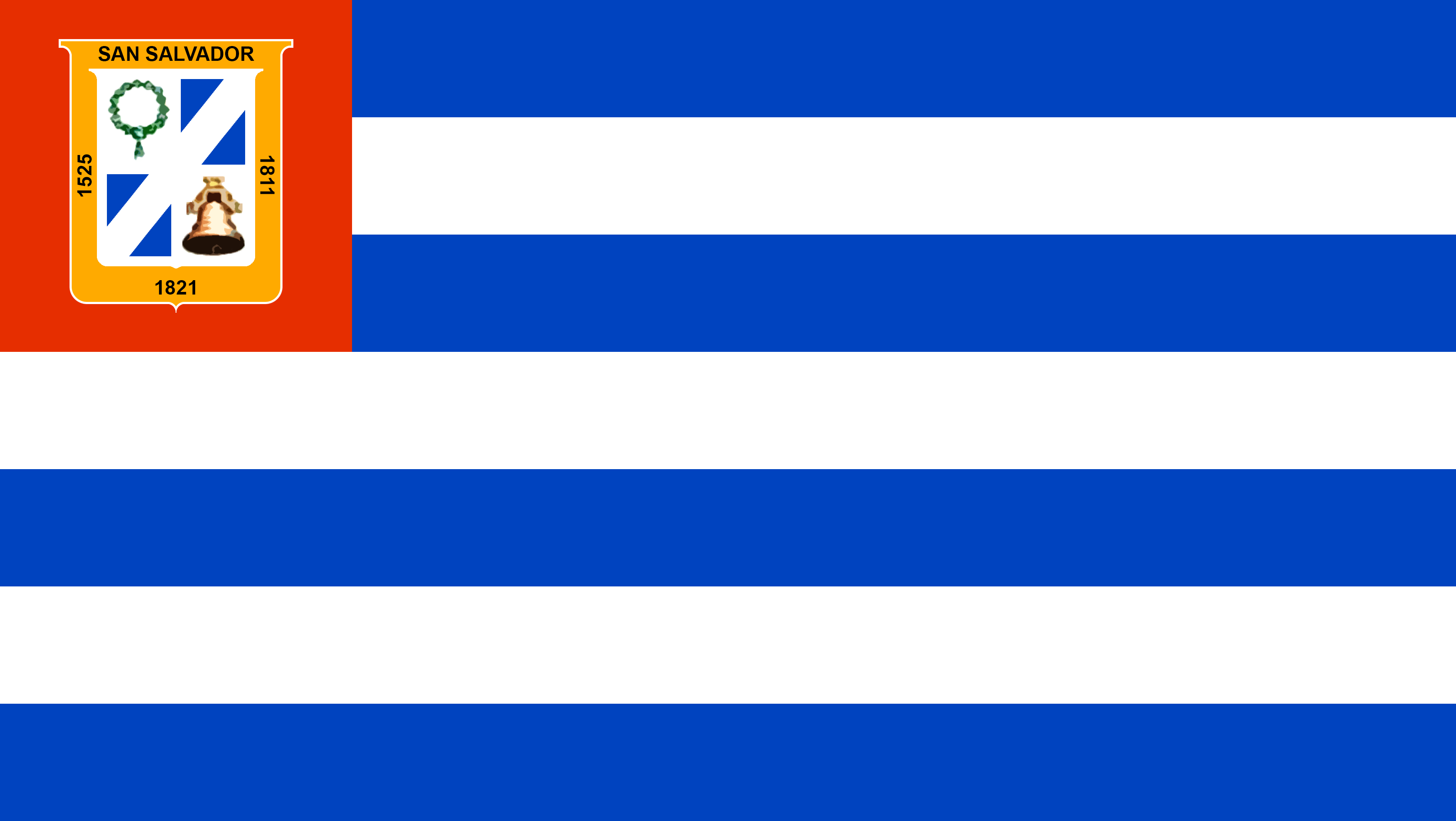
Flag of San Salvador Department in El Salvador

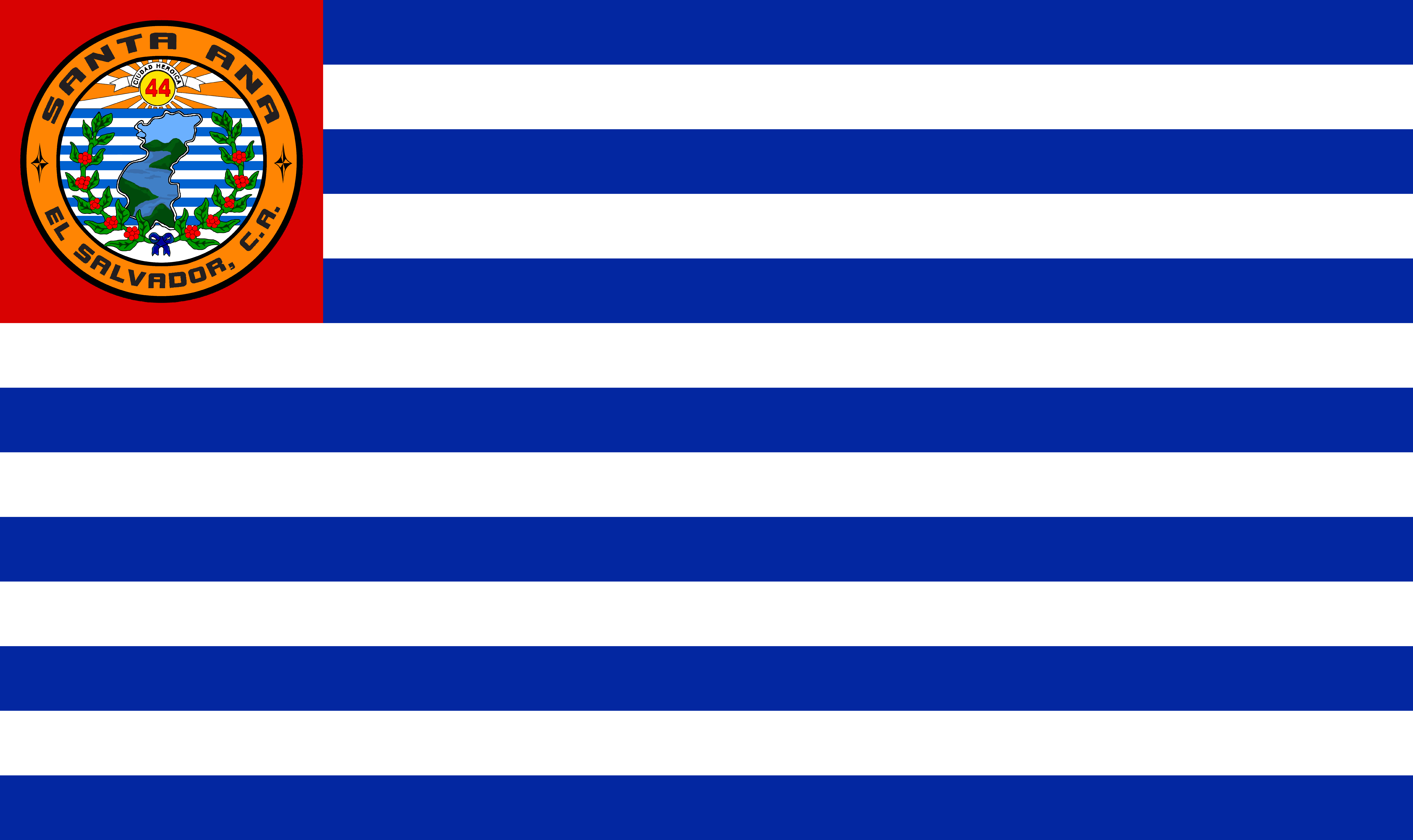
Flag of Santa Ana Department in El Salvador

The flag of São Paulo in Brazil

Flag and coat of arms of Selangor in Malaysia is not a true canton, although the standard of the Sultan of Selangor, which derives from it, retains the upper hoist as a distinct canton.

The flag of Sergipe in Brazil

Unofficial flag of Wallis and Futuna in France

Flag of Zanzibar in Tanzania with the flag of Tanzania in it.

==== Military ====
Australian White Ensign, which has a canton consisting of the Union Flag.

Royal Australian Air Force Ensign, which has a canton consisting of the Union Flag.

Naval ensign of Canada, which has a canton consisting of Canada's national flag.

Naval ensign of India, which has a canton consisting of an elongated Indian national flag.

Naval ensign of Sierra Leone, has a canton with a horizontal triband of green, white, and blue (e.g. the Sierra Leone national flag).

Flag of the South African Army, which has a canton with the RSA's national flag in it.

Flag of the South African National Defence Force, which has a canton with the RSA's national flag in it.

Naval ensign of South Africa, which has a canton with the RSA's national flag in it.

Naval ensign of the United Kingdom, which has a canton consisting of the UK's national flag in it.

Civil ensign of the United Kingdom, which has a canton consisting of the UK's national flag in it.

Blue ensign of the United Kingdom, which has a canton consisting of the UK's national flag in it.

==== Other ====
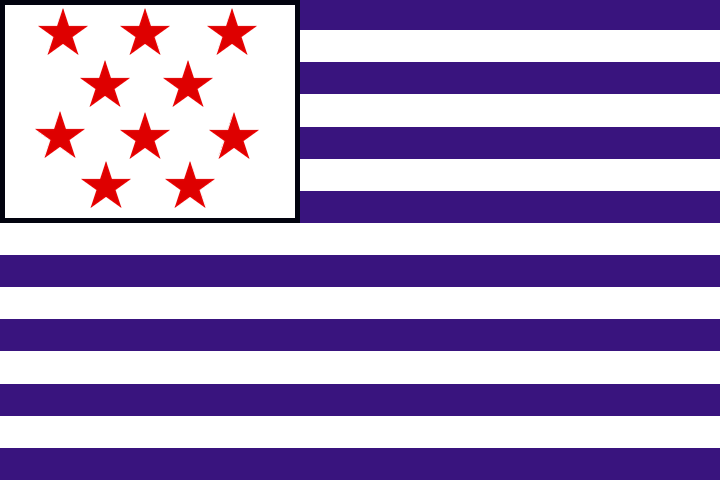
Flag of the Bakassi Movement for Self-Determination.

Flag of the Korean National Association, with a yellow canton defaced with a blue-and-red taeguk.

Flag of the New York City Police Department has a blue canton defaced with stars, representing the 23 original municipalities that combined to form modern day NYC, and one for NYC itself.

Flag of the South African Police Service, which has a canton with the RSA's national flag in it.

=== Former flags that used cantons ===
==== States ====
Flag of the Russian Empire, used 1914–1917.

Old Flag of Georgia, used 1918-1921 and 1991–2003.

A Soviet-era flag for Georgia, It was the only Soviet Union Republic flag with the canton and in which the hammer and sickle were not gold in color.

The November 1889 flag of Brazil had a blue canton defaced with 21 white stars.

The first version of the flag of the Confederate States featured a canton defaced with stars, with the stars representing its claimed constituent states

Subsequent flags of the CS incorporated a star-defaced saltire (known as the "Confederate Battle Flag") in their cantons.

The flag of the Mosquito Coast (1881–1894).

The flag of the Orange Free State had a canton with a horizontal triband of red, white, and blue (e.g. the Dutch flag) in it.

The First Texas Navy Ensign [Republic of Texas] (1836 - 1839) had a blue canton, defaced with a single star.

The flag of the United Tribes of New Zealand from the Declaration of Independence in 1835 until William Hobson proclaimed British sovereignty in 1840 puts the Southern Cross in the canton of the St George Cross.

==== Territories, organizations, and subdivisions ====
===== Canada =====
Flag of the Canadian Army from 1939 to 1944, which had a canton consisting of the UK's national flag.

Flag of the Canadian Army from 1968 to 1998 used a canton consisting of Canada's national flag.

===== Confederate States =====
An early 1860s flag of CS Tennessee

A former flag of CS Louisiana

A former flag of CS Mississippi

===== El Salvador =====
1839-1865

1869

1869-1873

1877-1912

===== France =====
Many French colonial flags contained the Flag of France in the canton.

===== Georgia =====
A Soviet-era flag for Adjara (then the Ajarian ASSR) combined a blue glory with red hammer and sickle.

===== Serbia and Montenegro =====
Naval ensign of Serbia and Montenegro from 1992 to 2006, which had a canton with a horizontal triband of blue, white, and red (e.g. the Serbia and Montenegro national flag) in it.

===== South Africa =====
Flag of the Cape Colony had a canton consisting of the UK's national flag; like most of the UK's colonies.

Flag of the South African Defence Force, which had a canton with the RSA's national flag in it.

Flag of the South African Police, which had a canton with the RSA's national flag in it.

===== United States =====
A former flag of the United States from 1775, which had the Flag of Great Britain from 1707 to 1800.

The Flag of Mississippi had the Confederate battle flag in the canton in its designs from 1894 to 2020.

An early flag design for New Mexico, which shows a rare instance of the US flag as a canton

Flag of the short lived Republic of Vermont, which adapted the US flag's union of 13 stars

An early flag for Vermont, which was substantially identical to the US flag of the time

===== Yugoslavia =====
Yugoslav naval ensign from 1949 to 1993, which had a canton consisting of a horizontal triband of blue, white, and red, defaced with a star and wreath.

Flag of the SR BiH, which had a canton consisting of the Yugoslav flag.

==== Others ====
This was a flag of Chile in Civil Use from 1826 to 1854

This was a former flag of the East India Company from 1600 to 1602.

This was a former flag of the East India Company from 1603 to 1800.

This was the final flag of the East India Company from 1801 before it was stripped of its power in 1874.

This was a former flag of Gabon from 1959 to 1960 which had the flag of France as its canton.

This was a former flag of Haiti from 1791 to 1798.

This was a former flag of Liberia from 1827 to 1847.

This was a former flag of the Republic of Maryland from 1854 to 1857.

=== Proposed flags and Ensigns that had cantons ===
Third proposed flag of Malaysia features a crescent and 5-pointed star in white on a red field.

Proposed flag not adopted by Māori; it included the Union Jack and lacked sufficient red.

Initial design of the United Tribes flag.

Proposed flag of the Cook Islands from 1973, designed by Len Staples.

== See also ==
- Canton (heraldry)
