= Australian White Ensign =

Naval ensign

- Use: Naval ensign
- Adopted: First used on RAN ships in 1967.
- Design: A defaced British White Ensign without the cross. The cross is replaced with the Southern Cross and the Commonwealth Star/Federation Star.

The Australian White Ensign (also known as the Australian naval ensign or the Royal Australian Navy ensign) is a naval ensign used by ships of the Royal Australian Navy (RAN) from 1967 onwards. From the formation of the RAN until 1967, Australian warships used the British White Ensign as their ensign. However, this led to situations where Australian vessels were mistaken for British ships, and when Australia became involved in the Vietnam War, the RAN was effectively fighting under the flag of another, uninvolved nation. Proposals were made in 1965 for a unique Australian ensign, which was approved in 1966, and entered use in 1967.

The Australian White Ensign is identical in design to the Australian national flag, but with the reversal of the blue background and the white Commonwealth Star and Southern Cross.

== History ==
Before Australia's Federation, the Colonial navies flew the British Blue Ensign, defaced with the symbol of the relevant colony. When operating outside colonial waters, these ships had to be commissioned into the Royal Navy, and consequently flew the British White Ensign.

The British White Ensign was used as the ensign of the Royal Australian Navy from 1911 to 1967

During the early 1900s, several British dominions, including Australia, began to campaign for the right to create naval forces independent of the Royal Navy, and capable of deploying outside territorial waters. During the 1909 Imperial Conference, Canada and Australia campaigned for this, and suggested that these ships fly the British White Ensign, defaced with an emblem representing the dominion. No binding decision was made on the matter. During the lead up to the creation of the RAN, the issue was raised again: Australian politicians and the public wanted Australian ships to fly a unique ensign, while the British Admiralty wanted them to fly the British White Ensign. Suggested Australian ensigns included the British ensign defaced with a blue Commonwealth Star, or a variant of the Australian national flag. Australian warships used the national flag as an ensign until the formal creation of the RAN from the Commonwealth Naval Forces on 10 July 1911: ships were ordered to fly the British ensign, while the Australian flag was used as a jack to identify their nationality.

Australian warships regularly found themselves mistaken for their British counterparts. One attempt to alleviate this was made by the executive officer of HMAS Anzac during the Korean War, when he had a kangaroo-shaped 'weathervane' made and mounted to the destroyer's mainmast: this became the basis for the red kangaroo symbol fixed to the funnels or superstructure of major RAN vessels.

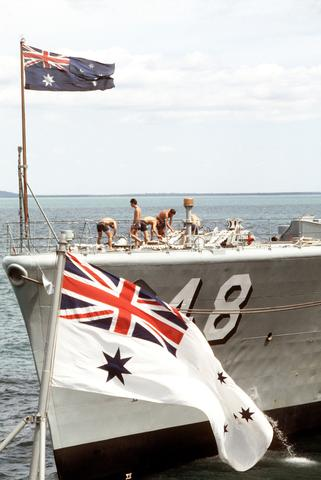
The design of the national flag of Australia (top) was the basis of the Australian White Ensign (bottom)

Australia's participation in the Vietnam War put the RAN in a difficult situation: the United Kingdom was not involved in the conflict, and RAN ships were effectively fighting under the flag of another, uninvolved nation. During a Naval Estimates hearing in 1965, Victorian politician Samuel Benson voiced concern over the use of the British ensign by Australian ships on wartime deployments, and Don Chipp, Minister for the Navy, announced that an Australian ensign was under consideration. In 1966, Prime Minister Harold Holt added his support to the idea that a unique RAN ensign was required. The First Naval Member of the Australian Commonwealth Naval Board, Sir Alan McNicoll, proposed two designs to the board members: one retaining the Saint George's Cross from the old ensign but replacing the Union Flag in the canton with the Australian flag, the other retaining the Union flag and replacing the cross with the six stars from the Australian flag. McNicoll was in favour of retaining the Union flag, and in January 1966, the Naval Board recommended that the second design for the new ensign. The design was approved under section five of the Australian Flags Act 1953. Royal Assent was granted to the new flag by Queen Elizabeth II on 7 November 1966, and its creation was formally announced by Prime Minister Holt on 23 December 1966.

The official changeover occurred on 1 March 1967, with all ships and establishments hoisting the new flag that day. The date was brought forward from 1 May 1967 to correspond with the commissioning of the chartered cargo ship Boonaroo, which became the first ship commissioned under the new ensign. However, the frigate HMAS Stuart was the first to use the ensign, when the ship's company unofficially flew the flag on 25 December 1966 as part of shipboard Christmas Day celebrations while deployed to the Far East Strategic Reserve. Only two RAN ships served in conflict under both the old and new ensigns: the aircraft carrier (later troopship) HMAS Sydney and the destroyer HMAS Vendetta.

== Design and use ==
The Australian White Ensign has been used in the first quarter of the Australian Navy Cadet Ensign since 1972.

The flag is white, with the Union Flag in the canton. A blue Commonwealth Star is located in the lower hoist. The Southern Cross constellation is depicted in the fly in the same manner as the national flag, but in blue instead of white.

Regulations for the use of the Australian White Ensign are detailed in Australian Book of Reference (ABR) 1834 Volume III. Although the flag is normally reserved for use by commissioned warships of the RAN, special dispensation has been granted to the museum vessels HMAS Vampire and HMAS Onslow, The sail training ship Young Endeavour as a non-commissioned ship in Naval service wears the AWE.

The Blue Ensign of the Australian Navy Cadets uses the Australian White Ensign in the canton.

=== Battle ensign ===
During battle, commissioned ships of the RAN will fly a large Australian White Ensign at the foremast of single masted ships, and at the mainmast of two masted ships.

== See also ==
- Flags of the Australian Defence Force
