= Australian Defence Force Ensign =

Flag representing the Australian Defence Force

- Use: Other
- Proportion: 1:2
- Adopted: 1969 (as the Joint Services Flag); 14 April 2000 (as the Australian Defence Force Ensign)
- Design: A vertical tricolour of dark blue, red and light blue, charged with the emblem of the Australian Defence Force in yellow

The Australian Defence Force Ensign is a flag of Australia which represents the tri-service Australian Defence Force. The design was formally recognised by the Australian Government as a flag of Australia with an amendment to the Flags Act 1953 passed on 14 April 2000.

The Navy and Air Force also have individual ensigns: the Royal Australian Navy Ensign and the Royal Australian Air Force Ensign. The Army has historically used the Flag of Australia. The Defence Ensign is supposed to be used in the case of joint activities. It is made up of three vertical bands: dark blue, red and light blue, representing the Navy, Army and Air Force respectively. In the centre is a large joint services emblem in yellow. This emblem features an anchor, crossed swords and a wedge-tailed eagle with wings outstretched combined above a boomerang and below a crest featuring a seven pointed Commonwealth Star. The flag is similar to that of the United Kingdom's Ministry of Defence, first utilised in 1956 and is a common colour-scheme in British-aligned territories, used by fellow Commonwealth members such as Cyprus, India, Kenya and Nigeria.

The rank flags of staff with joint services commands, such as the Chief of the Defence Force and the Minister for Defence, are derived from the Defence Force Ensign.

== History ==
UK Unified Commanders-in-Chief badge, upon which the joint services flag was based

The emblem on the Defence Force Emblem derives from the emblem of the Chief of Staffs Committee. This emblem was first adopted in 1958, as an adaptation of the UK counterpart (the Unified Commanders-in-Chief), with a wedge tailed eagle replacing the generic one. In 1968, the emblem was incorporated into the new joint services flag for use in the Vietnam War, with the further modification of the replacement of the Crown replaced with a Commonwealth Star. This was originally proposed in 1958 by General Sir John Wilton, who wished for a more distinctively Australian symbol, and was opposed by some who wished to continue the tradition of expressing the services loyalty to the Crown. This emblem was also in corporate settings and on the Defence Long Service Medal.

In 2000, the joint services flag was gazetted as the Australian Defence Force Ensign.

== See also ==
- Flags of the Australian Defence Force
