= National Medal (Australia) =

- Obverse of medal and ribbon
- Type: Long service medal
- Awarded for: A minimum of 15 years "eligible service", including an assessment of good conduct
- Presented by: Australia
- Eligibility: Operational members of specified organisations which serve or protect the community at hazard to themselves, including police, fire, ambulance, corrective services, emergency services and voluntary search and rescue services
- Clasps: Awarded for each additional period of 10 years service
- Status: Currently awarded
- Established: 14 February 1975; 51 years ago

Highlights
- Total: 317,076 (30 June 2026)
- – 25 years – 35 years – 45 years Ribbon with Rosette(s)

Order of Wear
- Next (higher): Defence Long Service Medal
- Next (lower): Australian Defence Medal

The National Medal is an Australian award given for long service by operational members of specified eligible organisations. It was introduced in 1975, as an original component of the new Australian honours system, and replaced a range of medals available to military and civilian uniformed services for long service and good conduct. The eligible groups have in common that their members serve or protect the community at the risk of death, injury or trauma, hence it is only available to members of the eligible organisations who are operationally deployed. In the case of corrective services, eligibility is restricted to officers with custodial duties.

== Description ==
- The National Medal is a circular bronze medal, ensigned with the Crown of St Edward. The obverse shows the arms of the commonwealth of Australia within a rim carrying the inscription "The National Medal for Service" in capital letters.
- The reverse is plain.
- The 32 mm (1.3 in)-wide ribbon has 15 alternating gold and blue stripes. These colours are the livery colours of Australia, derived from the torse of the coat of arms of Australia.
- The clasp is a bronze bar having 10 raised hemispheres. When the ribbon is worn alone, the award of a clasp is indicated by a ribbon emblem in the form of a representation of the medal.

== History ==
The award was originally available to members of the Australian Defence Force (ADF), Australian police services, fire services and ambulance services. Eligible service was only counted after a person turned 18, and service had to be continuous.

In 1982, the ADF withdrew from the National Medal, with the introduction of the Defence Force Service Awards (comprising the Defence Force Service Medal, the Reserve Force Decoration and the Reserve Force Medal). Even now, however, ADF service can be counted towards the National Medal under certain circumstances. At the same time, it was made explicit that service would be taken into account for the award regardless of whether it was full-time or part-time, paid or unpaid. This allowed volunteer fire fighters to qualify for the medal.

In 1986, the Australian Protective Service was admitted to eligibility, followed in 1987 by the Australian correctional services and Australian emergency services.

In 1999, the regulations governing the National Medal were completely revised and re-issued by Letters Patent to modify many points of eligibility, and to allow the addition of government and voluntary search and rescue organisations without the need to seek amendments to the Letters Patent by the monarch. The governor-general of the Commonwealth of Australia can now determine, by written instrument, that additional organisations are eligible.

=== National Police Service Medal ===
On 2 March 2011, the Australian Government announced that Queen Elizabeth II had signed Letters Patent on Tuesday 9 November 2010 instituting a new award within the Australian honours and awards system to accord "recognition for the unique contribution and significant commitment of those persons who have given ethical and diligent service as a sworn member of an Australian police service." This new award is to be known as the National Police Service Medal. All Australian police will now receive the National Police Service Medal to recognise their contribution to policing, as well as the National Medal to recognise their long service upon completion of 15 years ethical and diligent service.

== Eligibility ==
=== Government organisations ===
#	Organisation	Approved	Period of eligible service
1	Australian Defence Force	30 April 1987	14 February 1975 to 19 April 1982
2	Australian police force's	14 February 1975	14 February 1975 to Present
3	Australian fire service's	14 February 1975	14 February 1975 to Present
4	Australian ambulance service's	14 February 1975	14 February 1975 to Present
5	Australian Protective Service	1 April 1986	1 April 1986 to Present
6	Australian correctional service's	30 April 1987	30 April 1987 to Present
7	Australian emergency service's	30 April 1987	30 April 1987 to Present
8	St John Ambulance Australia	18 June 1999	1 January 1987 to Present
9	Royal Papua New Guinea Constabulary	4 April 2000	1 December 1973 to 14 February 1975
10	Public Transport Commission Security Services	30 April 1987	20 October 1972 to 30 June 1980
11	State Rail Authority, Investigation Branch	30 April 1987	1 July 1980 to 8 March 1988
12	New South Wales Police Force Special constables	9 March 1988	9 March 1988 to 25 May 1999
13	Australian Customs and Border Protection Service	23 September 2011	16 December 1999 to Present
14	Office of the Sheriff of New South Wales	23 September 2011	3 February 1988 to Present
15	Public Transport Authority, Security Officers (Transit Officers) and Special Constables	12 February 2019	17 March 1995 to Present
16	Junee Correctional Centre, custodial staff	23 September 2011	The day those functions were first performed by custodial staff
17	Parklea Correctional Centre, custodial staff	23 September 2011	31 October 2009 to Present
18	Fulham Correctional Centre, custodial staff	23 September 2011	The day those functions were first performed by custodial staff
19	Dame Phyllis Frost Centre, custodial staff	25 July 2013	The day those functions were first performed by custodial staff
20	Port Phillip Prison, custodial staff	23 September 2011	The day those functions were first performed by custodial staff
21	Arthur Gorrie Correctional Centre, custodial staff	23 September 2011	1 July 1992 to Present
22	Borallon Correctional Centre, custodial staff	23 September 2011	2 January 1989 to Present
23	Southern Queensland Correctional Centre, custodial staff	25 July 2013	The day those functions were first performed by custodial staff
24	Acacia Prison, custodial staff	23 September 2011	The day those functions were first performed by custodial staff
25	Mount Gambier Prison, custodial staff	23 September 2011	The day those functions were first performed by custodial staff
26	South Australian Prisoner Movement, custodial staff	23 September 2011	The day those functions were first performed by custodial staff
27	Sheriffs Office of the Courts Administration Authority of South Australia	5 August 2022	30 November 1978 to Present
28	Transport for NSW, Rail Fire and Emergency Unit for Sydney Trains	9 March 2025	The day those functions were first performed by accredited fire and emergency services officers

=== Volunteer organisations ===
#	Organisation	Approved	Period of eligible service	Notes
1	Australian Volunteer Coast Guard	28 April 2000	7 August 1970 to Present	
1	Royal Volunteer Coastal Patrol	3 July 2000	13 June 1963 to Present	
1	South Australian Sea Rescue Squadron	14 August 2000	18 May 1962 to Present	
1	Surf Life Saving Australia	16 October 2000	18 September 1986 to Present	
1	New South Wales Volunteer Rescue Association	19 February 2001	4 July 1988 to Present	
1	Mornington Volunteer Marine Rescue	18 April 2001	5 February 1990 to Present	
1	Central Queensland Helicopter Rescue Service	19 May 2004	11 September 1996 to Present	
1	Volunteer Marine Rescue Association Queensland	23 March 2005	11 September 1996 to Present	Merged with the Australian Volunteer Coast Guard Queensland in 2024 to form the Marine Rescue Queensland under the Queensland Police Service
1	Queensland Mines Rescue Service	5 August 2022	10 November 1997 to Present	
1	Queensland Remote Area Tracking	5 August 2022	22 March 2017 to Present	
1	Volunteer Marine Rescue Service of Western Australia	12 February 2019	The day those functions were first performed by operational personnel	
1	Shepparton Search and Rescue Squad	11 April 2007	28 November 1984 to Present	
1	Marine Rescue New South Wales	23 September 2011	1 July 2009 to Present	
1	Tasmanian Mounted Search and Rescue	23 September 2011	The day those functions were first performed by members	
1	Australian Ski Patrol Association	12 February 2019	22 March 1990 to Present	
1	Royal Life Saving Society Queensland	20 March 2025	The day those operations were first performed by volunteer members	
1	Bush Search and Rescue Victoria	29 April 2026	The day those operations were first performed by volunteer members	

== Nominations ==
The chief officer of each eligible organisation is authorised to recommend to the governor-general that an award be made to a member of their organisation. Where a person's eligible service spans several organisations, it is the current, or most recent chief officer who makes the recommendation. Organisations periodically submit schedules of multiple awards to Government House rather than sending them one at a time. The process is the same for awards of clasps indicating a further 10 years of service.

== Documentation ==
The regulations governing the award, a list of eligible organisations, and the Chief Officers Manual for the National Medal are available from the National Medal page of the Australian honours website.

== See also ==
- Australian honours and awards system
- Australian Honours Order of Wearing
