= Air Force blue =

Shades of the colour azure

Air Force Blue

Colour coordinates
- Hex triplet: #5D8AA8
- sRGB^{B} (r, g, b): (93, 138, 168)
- HSV (h, s, v): (204°, 45%, 66%)
- CIELCh_{uv} (L, C, h): (55, 37, 234°)
- Source: Vexillological:
- ISCC–NBS descriptor: Moderate greenish blue
- B: Normalized to [0–255] (byte)

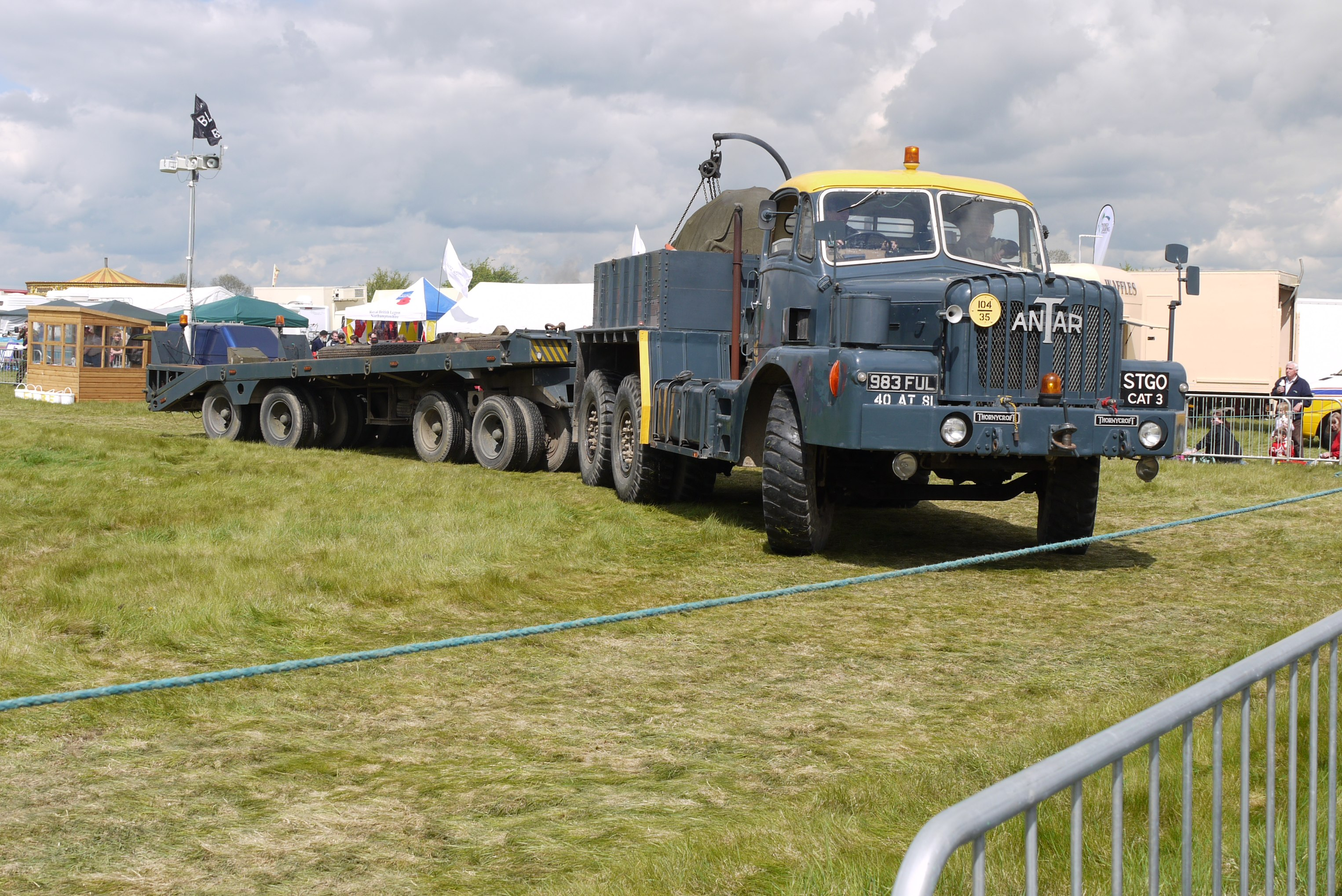
Thornycroft Antar Mk 3 in Royal Air Force blue colour scheme

Air Force blue colours are a variety of colours that are mostly various tones of the colour azure, the purest tones of which are identified as being the colour of the sky on a clear day.

Some air force blue colours, notably the air force blue colour used by the United States Air Force and the colour used by the US Air Force Academy, may look like they are tones of blue instead of azure. (Note: On the RGB colour wheel, which has 12 major colours, blue is the colour at a hue code of 240 degrees and azure is the colour halfway between blue and cyan at a hue code of 210 degrees.) However, they are actually dark tones of azure, not blue. (Note: This is because their hue (h) codes are between 195 and 225, the signature of a tone of azure.)

These air force blue colours are used by these various air forces for colour identification.

== RAF blue ==
Air Force Blue (RAF)

Colour coordinates
- Hex triplet: #6BA4B8
- sRGB^{B} (r, g, b): (107, 164, 184)
- HSV (h, s, v): (196°, 42%, 72%)
- CIELCh_{uv} (L, C, h): (64, 35, 220°)
- Source: Vexillological:
- ISCC–NBS descriptor: Moderate greenish blue
- B: Normalized to [0–255] (byte)

Air Force blue, more specifically Air Force blue (RAF) or RAF blue, is a medium shade of the colour azure. The shade derives from the light blue uniforms issued to the newly formed British Royal Air Force in 1920, which were influential in the design of the uniforms of some other air forces around the world. Similar shades are still used in Royal Air Force uniforms and the Royal Air Force Ensign.

The choice of blue uniforms for the RAF was the result of a surplus of inexpensive medium sky blue coloured herringbone twill in the United Kingdom, which had been intended for use in the uniforms of Czarist Russian imperial cavalrymen before the Russian Revolution occurred.

The field of the RAF ensign is specified as "NATO stock no.8305-99-130-4578, Pantone 549 C."

Royal Air Force Ensign

The shade of the colour that is shown in the colour info-box is the shade of air force blue used by the Royal Air Force. Some other air forces, notably those of the Commonwealth of Nations, use shades that closely resemble the shade of air force blue shown above, including the Royal Canadian Air Force, the Royal Australian Air Force, and the Royal New Zealand Air Force.

== US Air Force blue ==
Seal of the United States Department of the Air Force

Air Force Blue (USAF)

Colour coordinates
- Hex triplet: #00308F
- sRGB^{B} (r, g, b): (0, 48, 143)
- HSV (h, s, v): (220°, 100%, 56%)
- CIELCh_{uv} (L, C, h): (24, 69, 261°)
- Source: USAF
- ISCC–NBS descriptor: Vivid blue
- B: Normalized to [0–255] (byte)

Displayed at right is the colour Air Force blue (USAF).

US Air Force blue is designated as the colour Pantone 287.

=== USAFA blue ===
The shield of the US Air Force Academy

US Air Force Academy Blue

Colour coordinates
- Hex triplet: #004F98
- sRGB^{B} (r, g, b): (0, 79, 152)
- HSV (h, s, v): (209°, 100%, 60%)
- CIELCh_{uv} (L, C, h): (34, 66, 253°)
- Source: USAFA
- ISCC–NBS descriptor: Deep blue
- B: Normalized to [0–255] (byte)

Displayed at right is the colour US Air Force Academy blue.

The US Air Force Academy uses a particular shade of azure, subtly different from US Air Force blue, in its sporting and other insignia, described as USAFA blue in official documentation.

== Other variations ==
Other air forces of other nations of the Commonwealth of Nations, such as the Indian Air Force, the Pakistani Air Force and the South African Air Force, or other air forces of other nations that are not in the Commonwealth, such as the French Air Force, the German Air Force, the Russian Air Force, the People's Republic of China Air Force, the Japanese Air Force, the Islamic Republic of Iran Air Force, the Egyptian Air Force and the Israeli Air Force, for example, use a wide variety of brighter, lighter, or darker tones of blue.

== See also ==
- List of colours
- Navy blue
