= Royal Air Force Ensign =

Flag of the Royal Air Force

- Use: Air force ensign
- Proportion: 1:2
- Adopted: 1921; 105 years ago
- Design: A sky blue field with the Union Flag in the canton and the RAF Roundel in the fly

The Royal Air Force Ensign is the official flag that is used to represent the Royal Air Force. The ensign has a field of air force blue, with the United Kingdom's flag in the canton and the Royal Air Force's roundel in the middle of the fly.

The RAF Ensign was introduced in 1921, after some opposition from senior members of the Royal Navy. Various countries' air force ensigns have been based on the RAF's ensign. Currently, it is flown from the flagstaff of every Royal Air Force station during daylight hours, and it has been permanently displayed on the Cenotaph in London since 1943.

== Early history and authorisation ==
Ever since the formation of the RAF in 1918, the Air Council had wanted to introduce a flag which would be flown at RAF stations. However, the Admiralty had the right to veto the introduction of any new flag that was to be flown within the British Empire or on a British vessel. Although the Admiralty were initially opposed to granting the RAF its own flag, after considerable pressure from the Air Council, they reluctantly agreed to the introduction of such a flag, stating that the Air Force should adopt the Union Flag defaced with a suitable device. The Air Council did not welcome the Admiralty's condition, as they wished to use the White Ensign with the St George's Cross removed. Whilst the War Office had no objections to this proposed design, the Admiralty certainly did, and they rejected the Air Council's suggestion on the basis that the White Ensign was exclusively reserved for Royal Navy use.

The Air Council then submitted a design featuring a jack with a white border, but the Admiralty rejected this submission, as it was the already in use as the signal to summon a ship's pilot. The Air Council then re-submitted the original design which, unsurprisingly, was rejected once again.

When the situation came to the attention of King George V, he suggested that the matter be referred to the Cabinet. Although papers were drafted, the question was never debated in Cabinet.

The dispute soon became more widely known and various designs were suggested by members of the public. Although none of these suggestions were accepted, the idea that the Roundel (which had been used by both the Royal Flying Corps and the Royal Naval Air Service) might be adopted was viewed favourably by senior RAF commanders. Air Vice Marshal Sir John Salmond suggested that the Union Flag be placed in the canton in order that the design carry the mark of British authority. The Air Council subsequently agreed upon the design in use today as their preferred option.

The Chief of the Air Staff, Air Marshal Sir Hugh Trenchard, then brought the design before King George V, who approved the design. The design was then sent to the Admiralty and it was accepted as an ensign in December 1920. On 24 March 1921, the king signed an Order in Council ratifying its use.

The official design code for the RAF Ensign is "UNKG0018" and the azure blue used is "NATO stock no.8305-99-130-4578, Polyester Bunting in Pantone 549C".

== Use on the Cenotaph ==
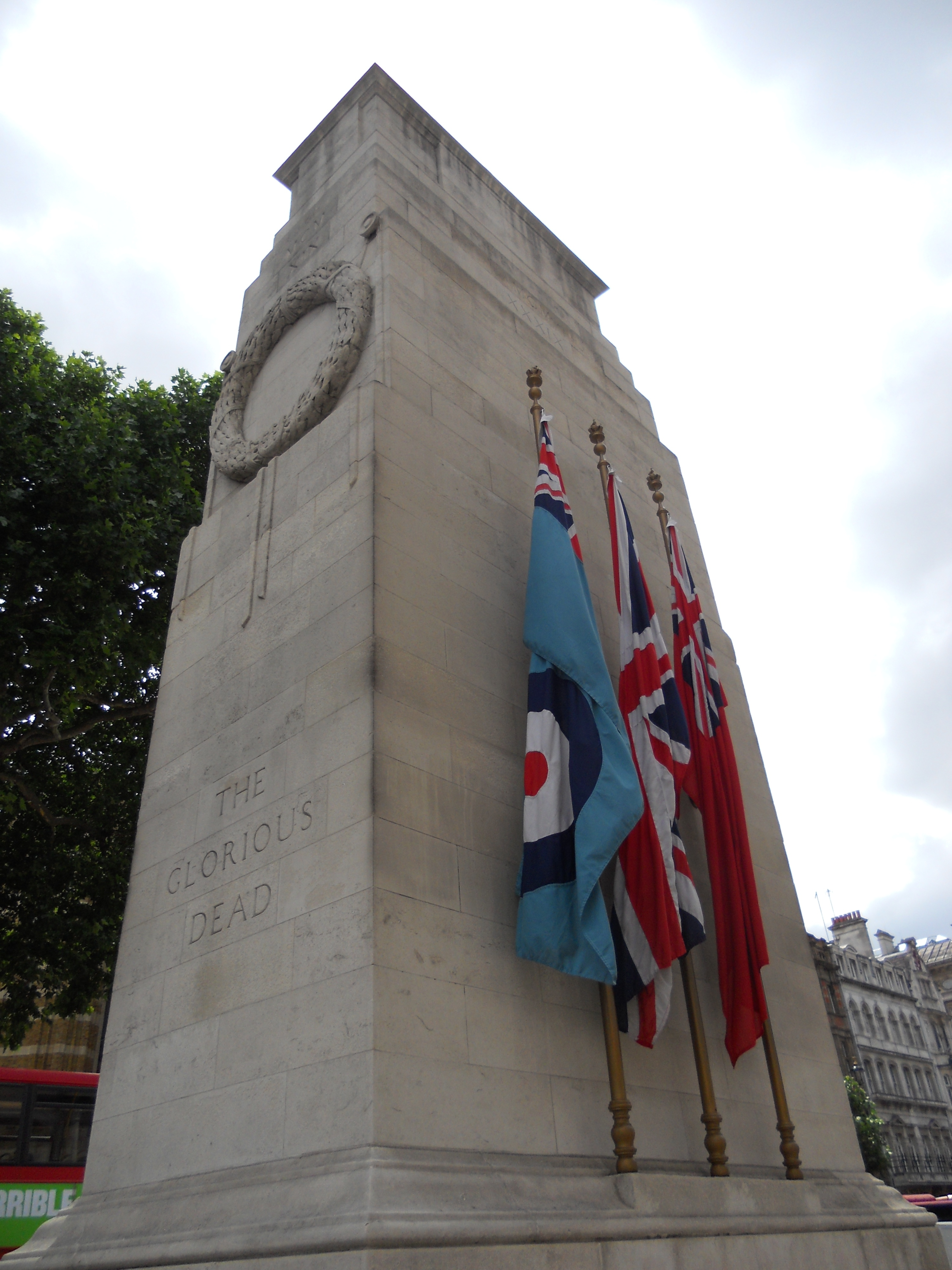
The Cenotaph, London.

Following the institution of the RAF Ensign in 1921, there were occasional suggestions that it should be flown on The Cenotaph. These suggestions were rejected, as the RAF Ensign had not been created until after the Great War, and the RAF itself had only been established for the last seven months of the War. At this time a Union Flag, a White Ensign and a Red Ensign were flown on one side of the Cenotaph and a Union Flag, a White Ensign and a Blue Ensign were flown on the other side.

During February 1943, the Chief of the Air Staff, Air Chief Marshal Sir Charles Portal, succeeded in getting the informal agreement of Buckingham Palace that the RAF should be represented on the Cenotaph by the flying of RAF ensigns on either side of the monument. However, when this request was passed to the Prime Minister, Winston Churchill, he rejected the proposal, stating his opposition to any change. To make a second attempt at gaining the approval of the Prime Minister, the agreement of the First Lord of the Admiralty and the Secretary of State for War to the substitution of only one flag was secured. The Cabinet also favoured the new proposal, and although the Prime Minister remained opposed to any change, he acceded to the will of the Cabinet.

The Admiralty requested that the substitution be done with no ceremony and only involve the minimum number of people necessary for the task. On 1 April 1943, exactly a quarter of a century after the foundation of the RAF, an RAF Ensign was substituted for the White Ensign on the west side of the Cenotaph, with the change being effected just after dawn. Later the same day at 11:30 a.m., an RAF Regiment guard paraded at the Cenotaph and a wreath was placed underneath the RAF Ensign.

== Use on sea-going craft ==
The RAF Ensign was flown by vessels belonging to the RAF Marine Branch including those sea-going craft assigned to the Air Sea Rescue Service.

Although the 1921 Order in Council gave the RAF the authority to display the ensign as they saw fit, the Admiralty maintained that the Order did not supersede the regulations of the Merchant Shipping Act. The dispute was revived after World War II, and In 1947 His Majesty's Customs and Excise took control of an RAF vessel on the basis that the RAF Ensign it displayed was illegal. After the incident, air force vessels continued to display the RAF Ensign, and Admiralty objections finally ceased in July 1948 after King George VI had formally approved the designation 'His Majesty's Air Force Vessel' (HMAFV) for RAF vessels 68ft in length and over that were commanded by a commissioned officer.

== Modern usage ==
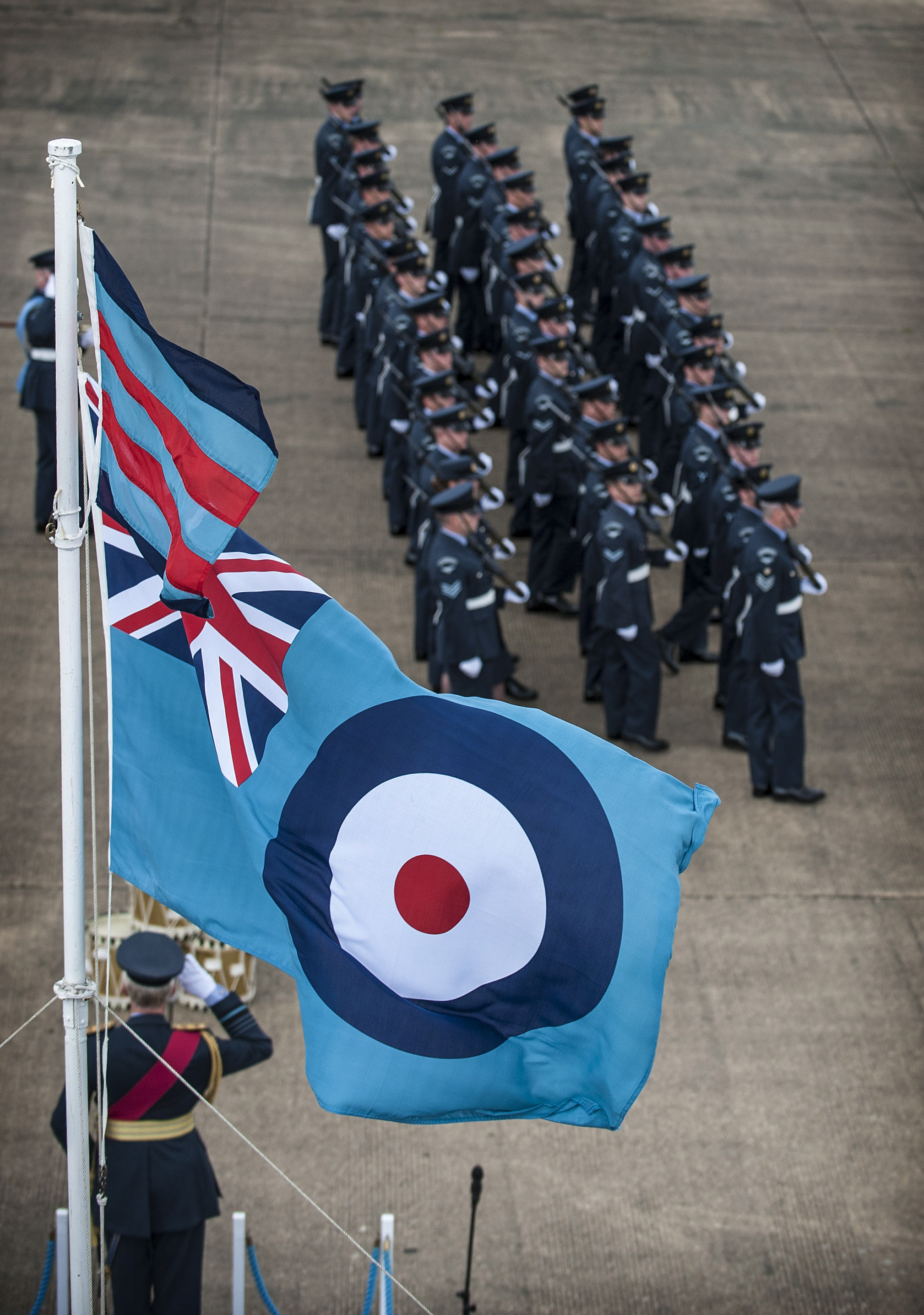
The ensign at RAF Honington

The RAF Ensign is flown from the flagstaff of every Royal Air Force station during daylight hours. Ordinarily, it is hoisted and hauled down by the station's duty NCO and saluted by the station's orderly officer. The ensign may also be hoisted or hauled down during a parade.

As the professional head of the RAF, the Chief of the Air Staff may fly the RAF Ensign. Air attachés and the heads of RAF Missions may also fly the RAF Ensign. It is also flown daily from the Ministry of Defence building in Whitehall, London.

In the general British flag precedence, the Royal Air Force Ensign is just below the Royal Navy's White Ensign and just above the Blue and Red Ensigns. The only exception to this rule is when the RAF Ensign is being flown in place of the Union Flag, when it takes that flag's precedence.

=== Restrictions on use ===
The RAF Ensign may not be used as bunting or decoration, or draped over a coffin, except at civilian funerals. In the latter case, only the Union Flag may be used at a British military funeral.

== See also ==
- British ensigns
