= Australian Defence Medal =

- Medal and ribbon
- Type: Service
- Awarded for: 4 years' service, completion of initial minimum period of service, death during service, or discharge as a result of injury
- Presented by: Australia
- Eligibility: Members of the Australian Defence Force
- Clasps: None
- Status: Currently issued
- Established: 20 March 2006

Highlights
- Total: 340,867

Order of Wear
- Next (higher): National Medal
- Next (lower): Australian Cadet Forces Service Medal

The Australian Defence Medal is an Australian military decoration which recognises current and former Australian Defence Force personnel who completed an initial enlistment period, or four years' service. It was established on 20 March 2006; however, it recognises qualifying efficient service of current and former Australian Defence Force Regular and Reserve personnel, including National Servicemen, who have served since 3 September 1945. It is estimated that up to one million current and ex-serving personnel are eligible for the award. At 30 June 2010, a total of 242,576 had been awarded, with 340,867 awarded by early 2022.

== Criteria ==
The criteria also include those who could not serve the four-year qualifying period or complete an initial enlistment period for one or more of the following reasons:

- the death of a member during service.
- the discharge of the member as medically unfit due to compensable impairment.
- the discharge of the member due to a prevailing discriminatory Defence policy, as determined by the Chief of the Defence Force.

== Description ==
- The Australian Defence Medal is a circular medal of cupro-nickel. The obverse features a stylised version of the Commonwealth Coat of Arms (as used on the Australia Service Medal 1939–45) with a sprig of wattle with the top outer edge inscribed with the words 'The Australian Defence Medal'.
- The reverse has the words 'For Service' below the Crown of St Edward, surrounded by a wreath of wattle.
- The ribbon colours include the black and red colour of the Flanders poppy and two white stripes to divide the red into three segments to denote the three services of the Australian Defence Force, and also represent the services contributing to the peace of Australia.
- Recipients name and Service Number are engraved on the medals rim.

== See also ==
- Australian Honours System
- Australian Honours Order of Wearing
