= List of country subdivision flags in Oceania =

Map of Oceania

This page lists the country subdivision flags in Oceania. It is a part of the Lists of country subdivision flags, which is split into continents due to its size. For purposes of this article, Oceania is taken to comprise Australasia, Melanesia, Micronesia and Polynesia.

The principal subdivisions are generally the ones that are identified as first-order subdivisions under the ISO 3166-2 coding scheme. If a country has no such first-order subdivisions, but has second-order subdivisions that have their own official flags, then the flags of those second-order subdivisions are given here.

This gallery includes only current official flags. For historical or non-official flags of any particular country or territory (if any), see the main article for that country or territory.

Unless indicated otherwise, information on each country has been taken from the World Factbook, as updated through July 11, 2016 (for which see the External Links section, below).

== Australasia ==
=== Australia ===
Australia comprises six states and two territories, as well as several dependant islands located in the Indian and Pacific oceans.

The official flag for each of the six states consists of the Australian national flag, but with the stars removed and replaced with the state's coat of arms.

Most of the dependent areas (sometimes called the "external territories") have no official flag of their own and instead use the Australian national flag. Three external territories do have their own official flags—Christmas Island, Cocos (Keeling) Islands, and Norfolk Island.

==== States ====
Flag	Date	Use	Description
	1876–present	Flag of New South Wales	A St George's Cross with four gold stars and a lion in the fly of a British Blue Ensign.
	1876–present	Flag of Queensland	A light blue Maltese cross with a crown on a white background in the fly of a British Blue Ensign.
	1904–present	Flag of South Australia	A piping shrike on a gold background in the fly of a British Blue Ensign.
	1875–present	Flag of Tasmania	A red lion on a white background in the fly of a British Blue Ensign.
	1877–present	Flag of Victoria	The Southern Cross surmounted by a crown in the fly of a British Blue Ensign.
	1953–present	Flag of Western Australia	A black swan on a gold background in the fly of a British Blue Ensign.

==== Territories ====
Flag	Date	Use	Description
	1993–present	Flag of the Australian Capital Territory	A vertical 1:2 bicolour of blue (charged with the Southern Cross) and gold (charged with a modified coat of arms of the city of Canberra).
	1978–present	Flag of the Northern Territory	A vertical 1:2 bicolour of black (charged with the Southern Cross) and ochre (charged with a stylised Sturt's desert rose).

==== Dependent areas ====
Flag	Date	Use	Description
	2002–present	Flag of Christmas Island	Blue and green diagonal bicolour charged with a Southern Cross of four seven-pointed white stars and one smaller five-pointed white star on the blue half, a golden bosun bird in gold on the green half, and a gold disc in the centre containing the shape of the island in green.
Link to image	2004–present	Flag of the Cocos (Keeling) Islands	A green field with a palm tree on a gold disc in the canton, a gold crescent in the centre of the flag and a gold Southern Cross in the fly.
	1979–present	Flag of Norfolk Island	A vertical triband of green, white, and green, with a Norfolk Island pine (Araucaria heterophylla) in the central white stripe.

=== New Zealand ===
New Zealand has sixteen first-level administrative subdivisions. Eleven of them are governed by regional authorities; the other five are governed by unitary authorities (which combine the roles of regional and territorial governance). The Chatham Islands lie outside any of the sixteen regions, but collectively possess some of the governing authority of a region. Most of these seventeen authorities have not adopted official flags.

The Realm of New Zealand includes two non-self-governing territories, one of which (Tokelau) has its own official flag. The other, the Ross Dependency, does not. It also includes the two island nations that are in free association with New Zealand—the Cook Islands and Niue. Their official flags are shown here.

==== Regions ====
Flag	Date	Use	Description
	1987–present	Flag of Nelson	The flag is based on the City of Nelson's coat of arms.
	2004–present	Flag of Otago	Per fess dancetty azure and or, two mullets of eight points in pale counterchanged.

==== Non-self-governing territories ====
Flag	Date	Use	Description
	2009–present	Flag of Tokelau	A yellow Tokelauan canoe sailing towards the Southern Cross represented by four white stars on a blue field.

==== Nations in free association with New Zealand ====
Flag	Date	Use	Description
	1979–present	Flag of the Cook Islands	A British Blue Ensign, defaced with a ring made of fifteen stars on the fly.
	1975–present	Flag of Niue	A golden yellow flag with the Union Flag in the upper left (hoist) quarter of the flag. On the Union Jack are two yellow five-pointed stars on the vertical stripe and two on the horizontal stripe. In the centre of the Union Flag is a blue disc with another, slightly larger, yellow five-pointed star.

== Melanesia ==
=== Fiji ===
Fiji is subdivided into fourteen provinces, which are loosely aggregated into four "divisions". There is also a self-governing dependency, Rotuma. None of these administrative units has adopted an official flag.

=== French collectivities in Melanesia ===
One of France's overseas regions is located in Melanesia. This region is New Caledonia, which is a special-status collectivity of France. It has a flag that shares its official status with that of the French tricolor.

Flag	Date	Use	Description
	1794–present	Flags of New Caledonia	A vertical tricolour of blue, white, and red.
	2010–present	Flags of New Caledonia	A horizontal tricolour of blue, red, and green charged with a yellow disc outlined in black and defaced with a black flèche faîtière.

==== New Caledonia ====
New Caledonia is a special-status collectivity of France, divided administratively into three provinces. Each has its own official flag.

Flag	Date	Use	Description
		Flag of the South Province	
		Flag of the North Province	
		Flag of Loyalty Islands Province	

=== Indonesia ===
The administration of Indonesia is divided among 38 provinces, eight of which are located in Melanesia (the others are located in Southeast Asia). The eight Melanesian provinces are Maluku, North Maluku, Central Papua, Highland Papua, Papua, South Papua, Southwest Papua, and West Papua.

==== Maluku Provinces ====
Flag	Date	Use	Description
		Flag of Maluku	
		Flag of North Maluku	

==== Papua Provinces ====
Flag	Date	Use	Description
		Flag of Central Papua	
		Flag of Highland Papua	
		Flag of Papua	
		Flag of South Papua	
		Flag of Southwest Papua	
		Flag of West Papua	

=== Papua New Guinea ===
Papua New Guinea is divided into twenty provinces plus a national capital district (i.e., Port Moresby) and Bougainville, an autonomous region. Each has its own official flag.

==== Provinces ====
Flag	Date	Use	Description
		Flag of Central Province	
		Flag of Chimbu	
		Flag of Eastern Highlands	
		Flag of East New Britain	
		Flag of East Sepik	
		Flag of Enga	
		Flag of Gulf Province	
		Flag of Hela	
		Flag of Jiwaka	
		Flag of Madang	
		Flag of Manus	
		Flag of Milne Bay	
		Flag of Morobe	
		Flag of New Ireland	
		Flag of Oro	
		Flag of Southern Highlands	
		Flag of Western Province	
		Flag of Western Highlands	
		Flag of West New Britain	
		Flag of Sandaun	

==== Districts and autonomous regions ====
Flag	Date	Use	Description
		Flag of the National Capital District	
	1975–present	Flag of the Autonomous Region of Bougainville	Red and white upe headdress superimposed on a green and white kapkap, on a field of cobalt blue.

=== Solomon Islands ===
Solomon Islands is divided into ten administrative areas, of which nine are provinces administered by elected provincial assemblies and the tenth is the capital Honiara. Each has its own official flag.

Flag	Date	Use	Description
		Flag of Central Province	
		Flag of Choiseul Province	
		Flag of Guadalcanal Province	
		Flag of Isabel Province	
		Flag of Makira-Ulawa Province	
		Flag of Malaita Province	
		Flag of Rennell and Bellona Province	
		Flag of Temotu Province	
		Flag of Western Province	
		Flag of Capital Territory	

=== Vanuatu ===
Vanuatu is divided administratively into six provinces. Each province has its own official flag.

Flag	Date	Use	Description
	?–present	Flag of Malampa Province	A descending diagonal tricolour of green-yellow-blue, with three black stars and a native canoe in the centre.
	?–present	Flag of Penama Province	Horizontal stripes: red-light blue-black-light blue-green (5:2:2:2:5). This flag has a white canton, with a boar's tusk, surrounded by a wreath of leaves of the namele fern. In the upper red stripe is a yellow five-pointed star, in the lower green stripe are two yellow five-pointed stars.
	?–present	Flag of Sanma Province	Light blue, with the national flag in the canon. The fly bears twelve white stars in four rows of three, and the lower hoist carries two yellow cogwheels, one inside the other.
	?–present	Flag of Shefa Province	A horizontal tricolour of blue-red-green, with the national flag (approximately one-sixth size along the hoist) in the canton. In the fly is a white-rimmed golden disk, extending into the blue and green stripes.
	?–present	Flag of Tafea Province	A blue field, a central horizontal stripe of yellow-red-yellow, five yellow stars, and a green canton containing a yellow cross and black shield.
	?–present	Flag of Torba Province	Diagonally arranged, blue in the upper hoist, stripes of red-yellow-black-white-green, and yellow in the lower fly. An emblem sits in the lower yellow triangular field.

== Micronesia ==
=== Federated States of Micronesia ===
The Federated States of Micronesia is a federal republic that has entered into a compact of free association with the United States. It has four states, each of which has its own official flag.

Flag	Date	Use	Description
		Flag of Chuuk	
		Flag of Kosrae	
		Flag of Pohnpei	A flag featuring a wreath of coconut leaves with eleven stars and a sakau cup in the middle, on a blue field.
		Flag of Yap	

=== Kiribati ===
Although Kiribati is split geographically into three areas (the Gilbert Islands, the Line Islands and the Phoenix Islands), these geographic divisions are not used for administration. Administrative units exist at the district and island levels, but none are first-order administrative subdivisions.

=== Marshall Islands ===
The Marshall Islands is a federal republic that has entered into a compact of free association with the United States. There are no first-order administrative subdivisions.

=== Nauru ===
Nauru is divided into fourteen administrative districts, none of which has an official flag.

=== Palau ===
Palau is a republic that has entered into a compact of free association with the United States. It is composed of sixteen states, each of which has its own official flag.

Flag	State	Description
	Aimeliik	Horizontal tricolor of green, black, and blue, with five white stars in the black band. The five stars represent the five hamlets of Aimeliik. Green represents Aimeliik's rainforest, black represents the fact that it was not conquered, and blue represents Aimeliik's large fishing area.
	Airai	The blue background represents the ocean and the white circle represents peace. The six stars stand for the six hamlets of Airai and the six fish for the six chiefs. In the centre is a ti plant.
	Angaur	The four stripes stand for the four hamlets of Angaur. In the center is a kelau flower.
	Hatohobei	The stars represent the three islands that make up the state. The clam shell represents Romohparuh, the first person on Hatohobei, who claimed ownership of the island by burying a clam shell.
	Kayangel	The flag is blue with a yellow triangle. It features an oar and two hibiscus vines.
	Koror	Main article: Flag of Koror A dark blue field with a crescent moon, seven stars and a bai on top of ten stones.
	Melekeok	The sun indicates that Melekeok is facing the east where the sun rises. The six sun rays represent the six hamlets of Melekeok. The bird, the 'Paluan money bird' or Bai-ra-Irrai (a Far Eastern curlew), is holding Palauan money known as chelbucheb.
	Ngaraard	The star's five points represent the five hamlets of Ngaraard. Earlier versions of the flag had a blue background instead of purple.
	Ngarchelong	The flag has eight stars representing the eight municipalities of Ngarchelong. Previous versions of the flag had seven stars. The flag has seven stripes representing the seven original municipalities.
	Ngardmau	The three stars represent the three hamlets of Ngardmau. Inside the circle is a picture of Ngerdmau Waterfall and Mount Ngerchelchuus. On top of the cirlcle is a kedam.
	Ngatpang	The flag consists of vines on a white background encircling a lamp made of clay. The three strands that hold the lamp represent the three hamlets of Ngatpang.
	Ngchesar	The green background represents the jungle and the six stars represent the six hamlets of Ngchesar. In the center is the state's spirit god ochaio.
	Ngeremlengui	The map in the center is the territory of Ngeremlengui. The linked chains represent the hamlets of Ngeremlengui.
	Ngiwal	The four stars represent the four hamlets of Ngiwal. The picture represents the abundance of sea food.
	Peleliu	The flag features the native bird belochel. The blue represents the ocean and the five stars represent the five hamlets of Peleliu.
	Sonsorol	The blue background represents the Pacific Ocean and the four stars represent the four islands that make up Sonsorol. The boat represents the finding of the islands by the people's ancestors.

=== United States in Micronesia ===
The United States has three territories in Micronesia. Two of them (Guam and the Northern Mariana Islands) are self-governing and have their own official flags. The third (Wake Island) is not self-governing and uses the flag of the United States as its official flag.

Three Micronesian nations have entered into a compact of free association with the United States. These are the Federated States of Micronesia, the Marshall Islands and Palau.

==== Territories ====
Flag	Date	Use	Description
	1948–present	Flag of Guam	A dark blue background with a thin red border and the seal of Guam in the center.
	1985–present	Flag of the Northern Mariana Islands	A circle of flowers and plants with a gray sculpture and a white star on a blue field.
	1976–present	Flag of Wake Island	Unofficial flag.

==== Micronesian nations in free association with the United States ====
Flag	Date	Use	Description
	1978–present	Flag of the Federated States of Micronesia	A light blue field with four white five-pointed stars arranged in a diamond pattern in the center.
	1979–present	Flag of the Marshall Islands	A blue field with two diagonal stripes of orange and white radiating from the lower hoist-side corner to the upper fly-side corner and a large white star with four large rays and twenty small rays on the upper hoist-side corner above the stripes.
	1981–present	Flag of Palau	A light blue field with the large yellow disk shifted slightly to the hoist-side of center.

== Polynesia ==
=== Chilean territory in Polynesia ===
Chile has one territory in Polynesia, Isla de Pascua (also known as Easter Island). However, it is administered as a province in the country's Valparaiso region, and not as a first-order subdivision of Chile.

=== French collectivities in Polynesia ===
There are two French collectivities in Polynesia—French Polynesia and Wallis and Futuna. French Polynesia has a flag that shares its official status with that of the French tricolor; Wallis and Futuna does not. Also, Clipperton Island is a French territory in Polynesia, but not a collectivity. It is uninhabited and does not have its own official flag.

Flag	Date	Use	Description
	1984–present	Flag of French Polynesia	Two red horizontal bands encase a wide white band in a 1:2:1 ratio, with the coat of arms centred on the white stripe.

=== French Polynesia ===
French Polynesia is an overseas collectivity of France. It consists of six archipelagos: the Austral Islands, the Gambier Islands, the Marquesas Islands, the Tuāmotu Islands, plus the Leeward Islands and the Windward Islands (the last two collectively formerly known as the Society Islands). Although French Polynesia has no first-order administrative subdivisions within the meaning of the ISO 3166-2 coding scheme, there are five second-order subdivisions that correspond to each of the archipelagos, except that the Gambier and Tuāmotu Islands are combined into a single administrative division. None of these divisions has adopted an official flag. However, a 1985 territorial decree permits the official use, alongside the French tricolour and the French Polynesian flag, of the official flag of the archipelago on which the flags are displayed. Four of the archipelagos have adopted such official flags. The two that have not are the Leeward Islands and the Windward Islands.

Flag	Date	Use	Description
	1837–present	Flag of the Gambier Islands	Horizontal triband of white, blue, and white, with five stars counterchanged, one in each corner and one in the center.
	1975–present	Flag of the Tuamotu Archipelago	Three horizontal stripes of red, white, and red, and a vertical blue stripe on the hoist, with two rows of eight blue stars on the white stripe.
	2018–present	Flag of the Marquesas Islands	Divided horizontally into yellow and red, with a white triangle on the hoist, whereupon is found a matatiki.
		Flag of the Austral Islands	A red flag with an emblem consisting of a blue traditional pestle surrounded by five blue stars on a white Canadian pale.
		Flag of the Leeward Islands	Seven horizontal stripes, alternately red and white.

=== Samoa ===
Samoa is divided administratively into eleven districts. None of them have adopted an official flag.

=== Tonga ===
Tonga is a constitutional monarchy composed of five administrative divisions. None of them have adopted official flags.

=== Tuvalu ===
Tuvalu is a nation administered by seven island councils, plus one town council (Funafuti). Only two of which, Funafuti and Vaitupu, have adopted official flags.

=== United Kingdom in Polynesia ===
The Pitcairn Islands are the only British overseas territory in Oceania. It has an official flag.

Flag	Date	Use	Description
	1984–present	Flag of Pitcairn Islands	A Blue Ensign charged in the fly with the coat of arms of the Pitcairn Islands.

=== United States in Polynesia ===
Hawaii, one of the fifty United States, is located in Polynesia, as is American Samoa, one of the territories of the United States.

Seven of the nine islands in the United States Minor Outlying Islands group are located in Polynesia. These are Baker Island, Howland Island, Jarvis Island, Johnston Atoll, Kingman Reef, Midway Atoll and Palmyra Atoll. None have a permanent population and all use the flag of the United States as their official flags.

==== States ====
Flag	Date	Use	Description
	1898–present	Flag of Hawaii	Eight alternating horizontal stripes of white, red, and blue, with the United Kingdom's Union Flag (ratio 4:7) in the canton.

==== Territories ====
Flag	Date	Use	Description
	1960–present	Flag of American Samoa	A red-edged white triangle pointing towards the hoist charged with a bald eagle clutching a war club and a fly-whisk. The white triangle divides the dark blue field into two separate triangles.

=== Wallis and Futuna ===
Wallis and Futuna is a collectivity of France. It is composed of three precincts—Alo, Sigave and Uvea—each corresponding to a traditional kingdom.

Flag	Date	Use	Description
		Flag of Alo	
		Flag of Sigave	
		Flag of Uvea	

== See also ==
- Flags of Oceania (a gallery of national-level flags)

== General references ==
- World Factbook - Administrative divisions (administrative divisions for all the world's countries, in a single list)
- Flags of the World (clickable map of Oceania)
