= French colonial flags =

French Empire Empire français
- Left: Royal Standard of France (before 1792); Right: Flag of the French Empire

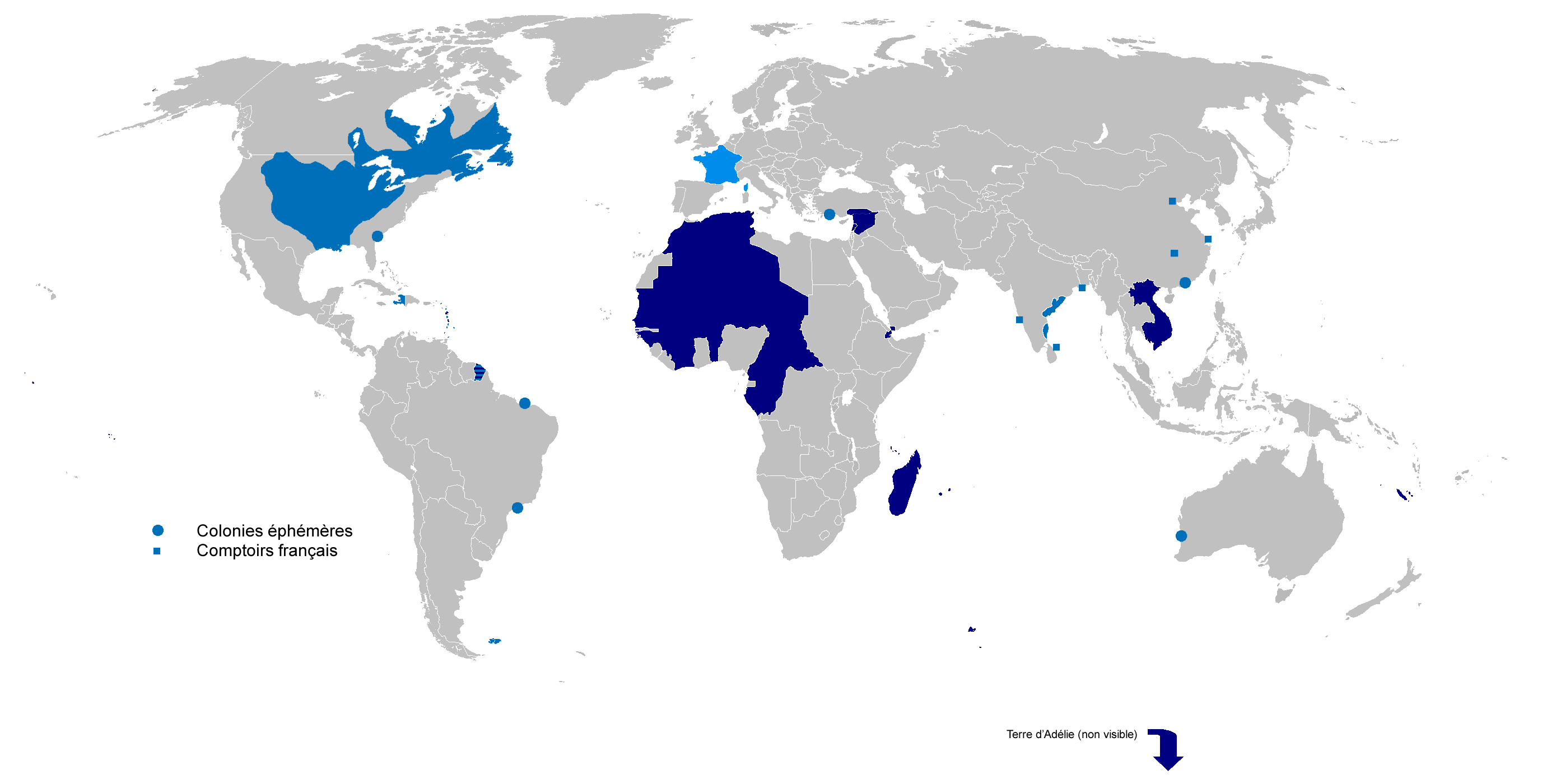
- Flags were used to represent various territories and colonies across the Empire

Some colonies, protectorates and mandates of the French Colonial Empire used distinctive colonial flags. These most commonly had a French Tricolour in the canton.

As well as the flags of individual colonies, the governors-general of French colonies flew a square flag with a blue field and the French ensign in the canton. This flag was flown beneath the national ensign. Colonial governors used a rectangular swallow-tailed version of this flag.

== Colonial flags with a tricolour canton ==
The flags with the French flag in the canton, which on many occasions were already existing flags without the tricolour, resembled the British colonial flags, which originated as defacements of the British ensigns, which have the British Union Jack in the canton, and a red, white or blue fly. Naval sources show flags such as those used in the French Mandate of Syria as having the tricolour with unequal stripes, as in the French ensign, but it is likely that these versions of the flags were used at sea, and on land the tricolour had the standard equal stripes.

While for the sake of simplicity French colonial ensign are on this page classified by appearance, this should not be taken to imply common origins or the existence of undefaced ensigns used by the French government unless otherwise noted.

=== Red field ===
- Laos, French Indochina: Laos was part of French Indochina from 1893. The tricolour was added to the flag of the Kingdom of Luang Prabang, which was red with a white image of a three headed elephant on a stand with a parasol.
- Morocco: The Protectorate of Morocco from 1919 to 1953, used the national flag with a tricolour in the canton as a civil ensign.
- Tunisia: From 1881 to 1956, Tunisia was a French protectorate. It has been reported that the tricolour was added to the Tunisian flag for use as a civil ensign, as in Morocco, but it seems that such a flag was never official.
- Wallis and Futuna: The unofficial, but commonly used flag of Wallis and Futuna is red with four white triangles arranged in a square and the tricolour in the canton with a white fimbriation.

=== Blue field ===
- Damascus: This part of the French Mandate of Syria from 1922 to 1925 used a blue flag with a white disk in the centre and the tricolour in the canton.
- Syria (1920): The French Mandate of Syria may have originally used a sky blue flag with a white crescent and star and French tricolour in the canton.
- In 1939, the governor-general's flag, was a square blue flag with a French ensign in the canton. With a swallow-tail, this flag was the colonial governors' flag.

=== White field ===
Flag of the Alawite State / Sanjak of Latakia

- Aleppo: This part of the French Mandate of Syria from 1920 to 1925 used a white flag with tricolour in the canton and three yellow five-pointed stars in a triangle in the fly.
- Lattakia: This part of the French Mandate of Syria used a white flag, ratio 2:3, with the tricolour in the canton taking up 1/9 of the area of the flag, red triangles in the other three corners, and a golden sunburst in the centre of the flag.
- The first banner of the French Revolution had a white field with a tricolour in the canton, although the order of the colours has since been reversed.

=== Green field ===
- Togo: The flag used in 1957–8 had two white five-pointed stars in the green field, one at the lower left-hand corner, the other in the upper right-hand corner.

=== Yellow field ===
Protectorate flag of Annam

- Annam, part of the Union of French Indochina from 1886 until 1954, used a flag with a plain yellow background, in two shapes one with the ratio 2:3 and the other 1:1 (square).

=== Multicolour field ===
- Jebel Druze. From 1924 until 1936, this part of the French Mandate of Syria had a flag with a white vertical strip beneath the tricolour in the canton, with the rest of the flag made up of green, red, yellow, blue and white horizontal stripes.
- Syria: In 1922, the French Mandate was made a federation, with a federal flag made up of green-white-green horizontal stripes and the tricolour in the canton. This flag was also used when Aleppo and Damascus merged.

== Colonial flags with other designs ==
Flag of French Lebanon

=== Modified tricolours ===
- Lebanon: The French Mandate of Greater Lebanon (1920–43) used as a flag the French tricolour with a green cedar in the middle stripe. See picture in Flag of Lebanon § History.

=== Other designs ===
- French Polynesia: The flag of French Polynesia has the horizontal stripes, red-white-red. The white stripe is twice the height of each red stripe, and contains an emblem consisting of a boat, the sun, and waves.

== Galleries ==
=== Historical flags ===
Flag of Annam, part of French Indochina (1923–1945)

Flag of Laos, part of French Indochina (1893–1953)

Flag of Cambodia, part of French Indochina (1863–1948)

Flag of the Imamate of Futa Jallon (1896-1912)

Flag of the Autonomous Republic of Togo (1957–1958)

Flag of the French Senegal (1958-1959)

Flag of French Equatorial Africa (1910–1958)

Flag of Gabon (1959–1960)

Flag used by some military units in the French protectorate of Tunisia (1881–1956)

Flag of the French Mandate of Syria (organized into five states (Sanjak of Damascus, Sanjak of Aleppo, Alawite State, Sanjak of Latakia, the Jebel Druze, Greater Lebanon) (1920–1922)

Flag of the Syrian Federation (1922–1924) and later State of Syria (1924–1930)

Flag of the State of Alawites, later Sanjak of Latakia, in the French Mandate of Syria (1920–1936)

Flag of the State of Aleppo, in the French Mandate of Syria (1920–1924)

Flag of the State of Damascus, in the French Mandate of Syria (1920–1924)

Flag of Jabal ad-Druze, in the French Mandate of Syria (1924–1936)

Flag of Madagascar, in the French Protectorate (1885–1895)

French Merchant Flag in the French Morocco (1919–1956)

Flag of Tahiti under the Protectorate of France (1842–1880)

Flag of the State of Greater Lebanon during the French mandate (1920–1943)

Flag of the Tai Dón people (1944–1953)

Flag of the Montagnard country of South Indochina (1946–1950)

Flag of the Tai Autonomous Territory (1946–1950)

Flag of the Sip Song Chau Tai (1950–1955)

Flag of the Tay people (1947–1954)

Flag of the Nùng Autonomous Territory (1947–1954)

Flag of the Muong Autonomous Region (1948–1954)

Flag of the French Protectorate of Wallis and Futuna (Uvea) (1860–1886)

Flag of the French Colony of French Sudan (1892–1959)

Flag of the French protectorate of Saar (1947–1956)

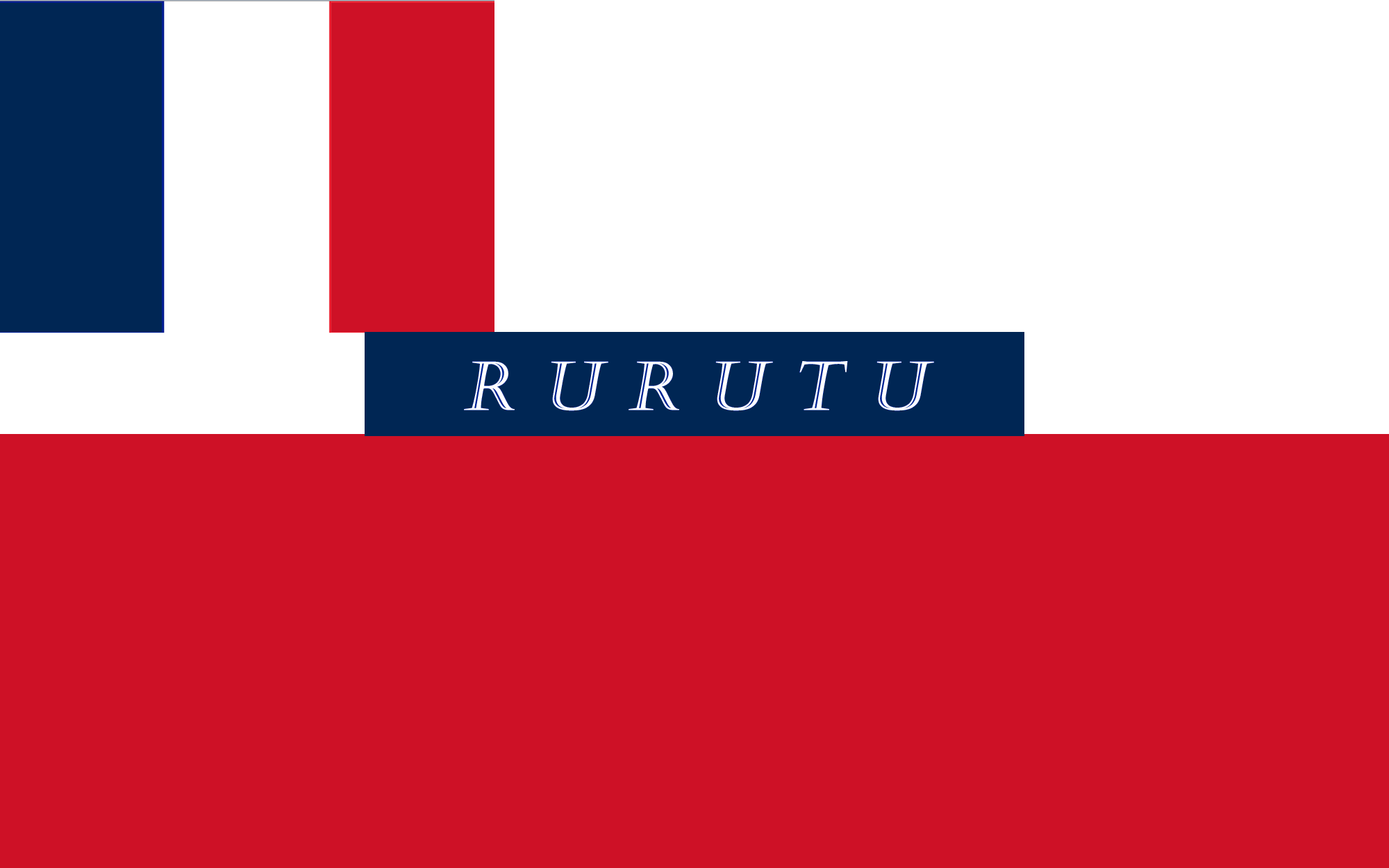
Flag of the French protectorate of Rurutu in French Polynesia (1889–1900)

Flag of a French Governor

Flag of French protectorate of Rimatara, part of French Polynesia (1891–1900)

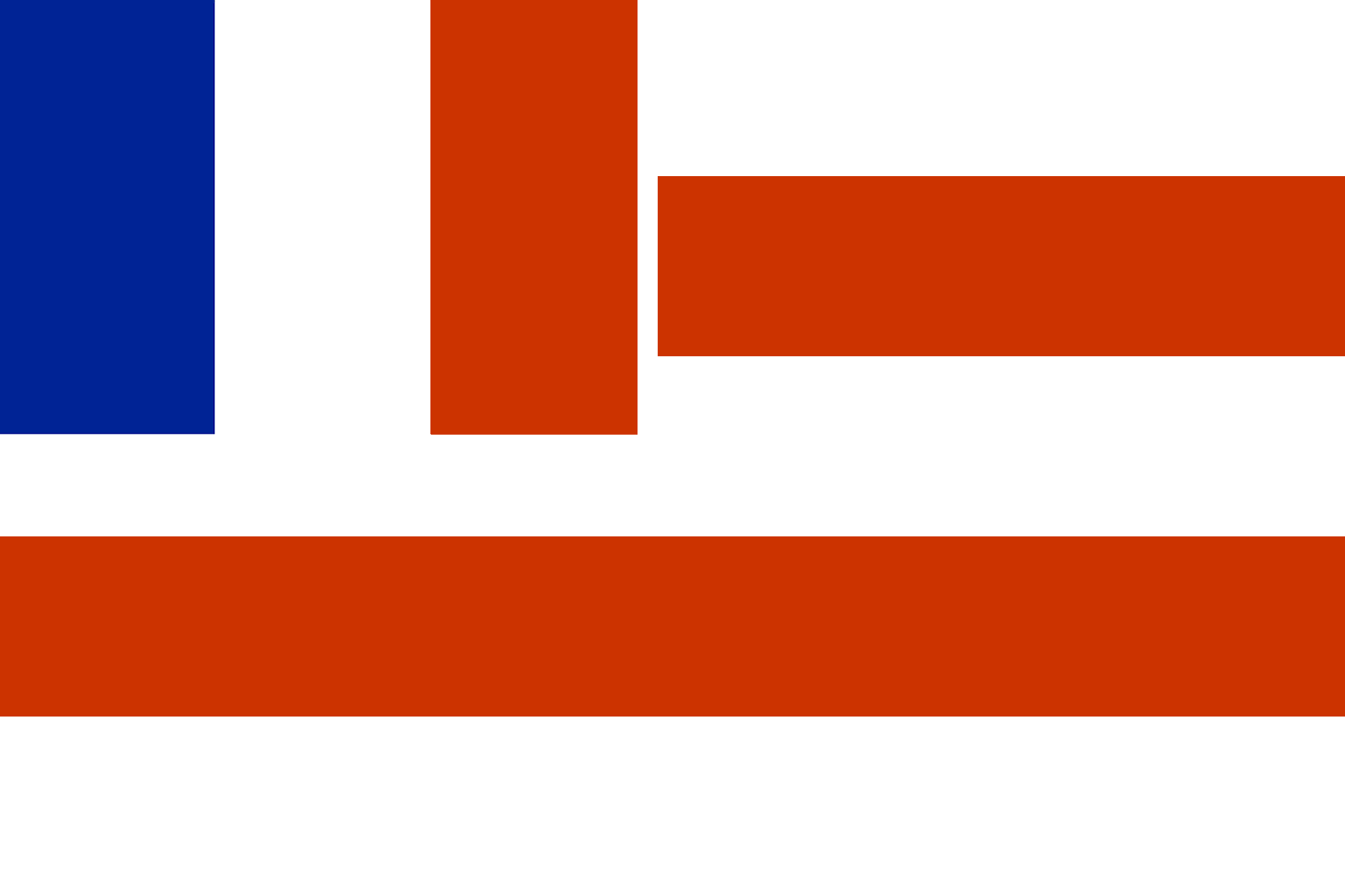
Flag of French Protectorate of Raiatea, part of French Polynesia (1880–1897)

Algerian ensign under the French rule (1848–1910)

Flag of French Governor General Pélissier (1848–1854)

Car's flag of Governor-General of Algeria Jacques Soustelle (1955–1956)

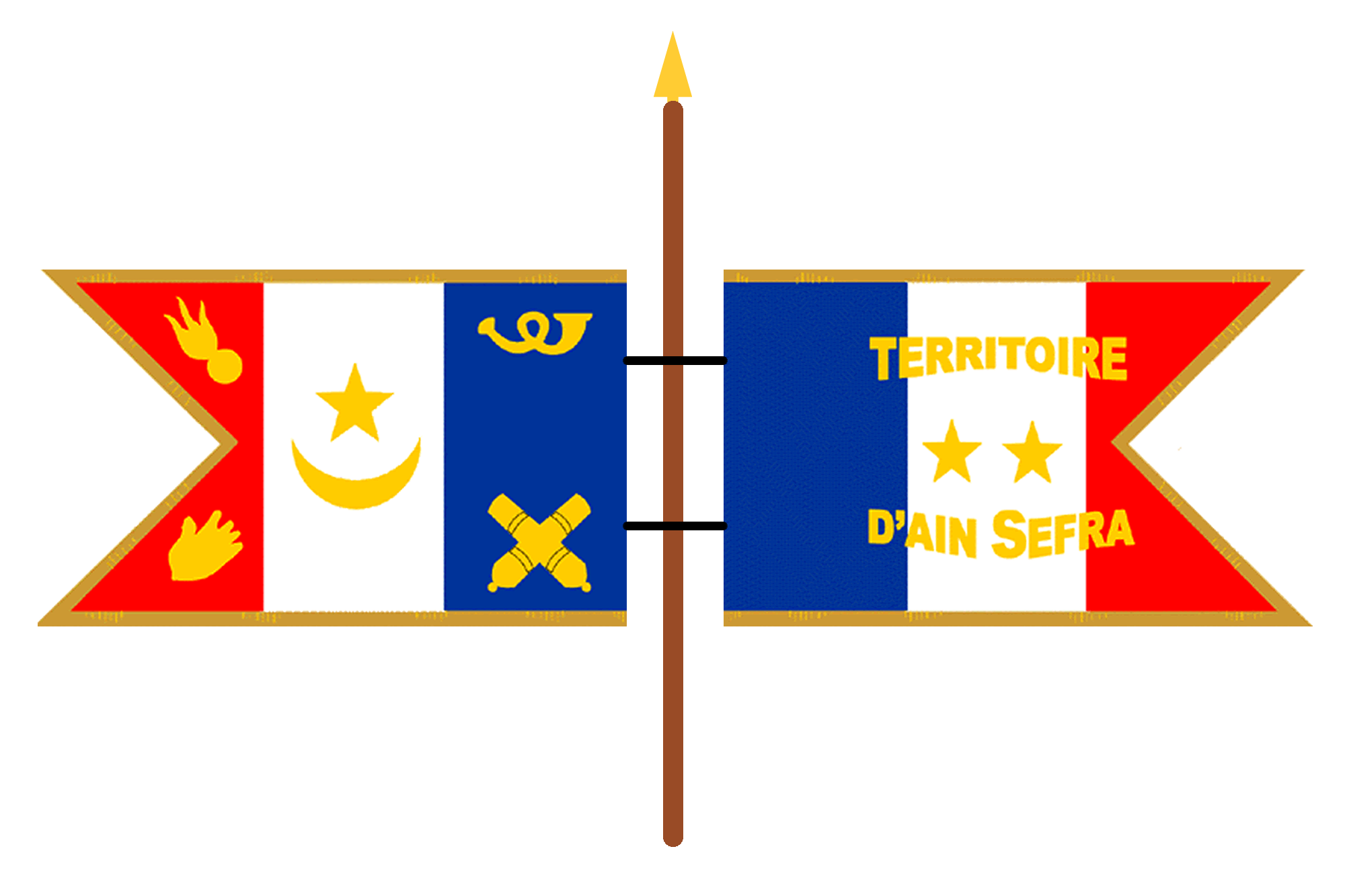
Flag of Ain-Sefra and the vehicle flag of General Laperrine (French Algeria)

Flag of French Protectorate of Wallis and Futuna (1886–1887)

Flag of French Protectorate of Wallis and Futuna (1887–1910)

Flag of French Protectorate of Wallis and Futuna (1910–1958)

Flag of French Protectorate of Wallis and Futuna (1958–1985)

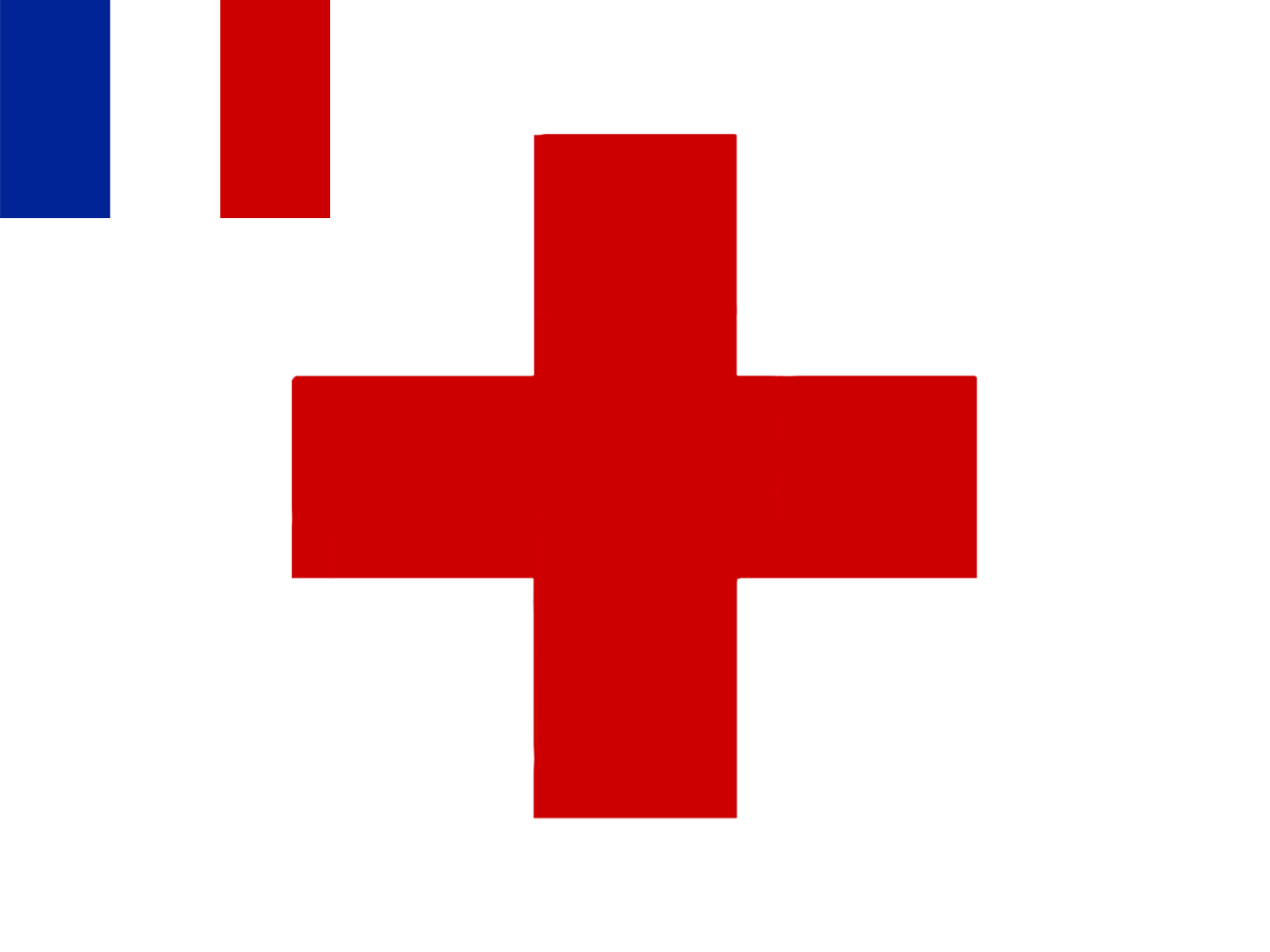
Flag of the French Society of Sea Works (1896–1935)

French Society of Strasbourg to Rhine Navigation

Flag of the Administrator of the French Southern and Antarctic Lands (1958–2005)

Flag of the Autonomous Albanian Republic of Korçë (1916–1920)

Flag of the Saar Protectorate (1947–1956)

=== Flags with French history ===
Flag of Acadia

Flag of the Franco-Americans

Flag of the Franco-Albertan

Flag of the Franco-Newfoundlander

Flag of the Acadians in New England

Flag of the Acadiana

Flag of the Franco-Columbian

Flag of the Franco-Manitobains

Flag of the Franco-Ontarians

Flag of Franco-Ténois

Flag of the Franco-Yukonnais

Flag of Fransaskois

Flag of Franco-Nunavois

Flag of Free France

Personal standard of Marshal Philippe Pétain as "Chief of State" of Vichy France

Flag of Pied-noir (2008–)

Unofficial flag of "French of Algeria" (Pied-Noir)

Flag of Louisiana in 1861

Flag of Free Republic of Vercors

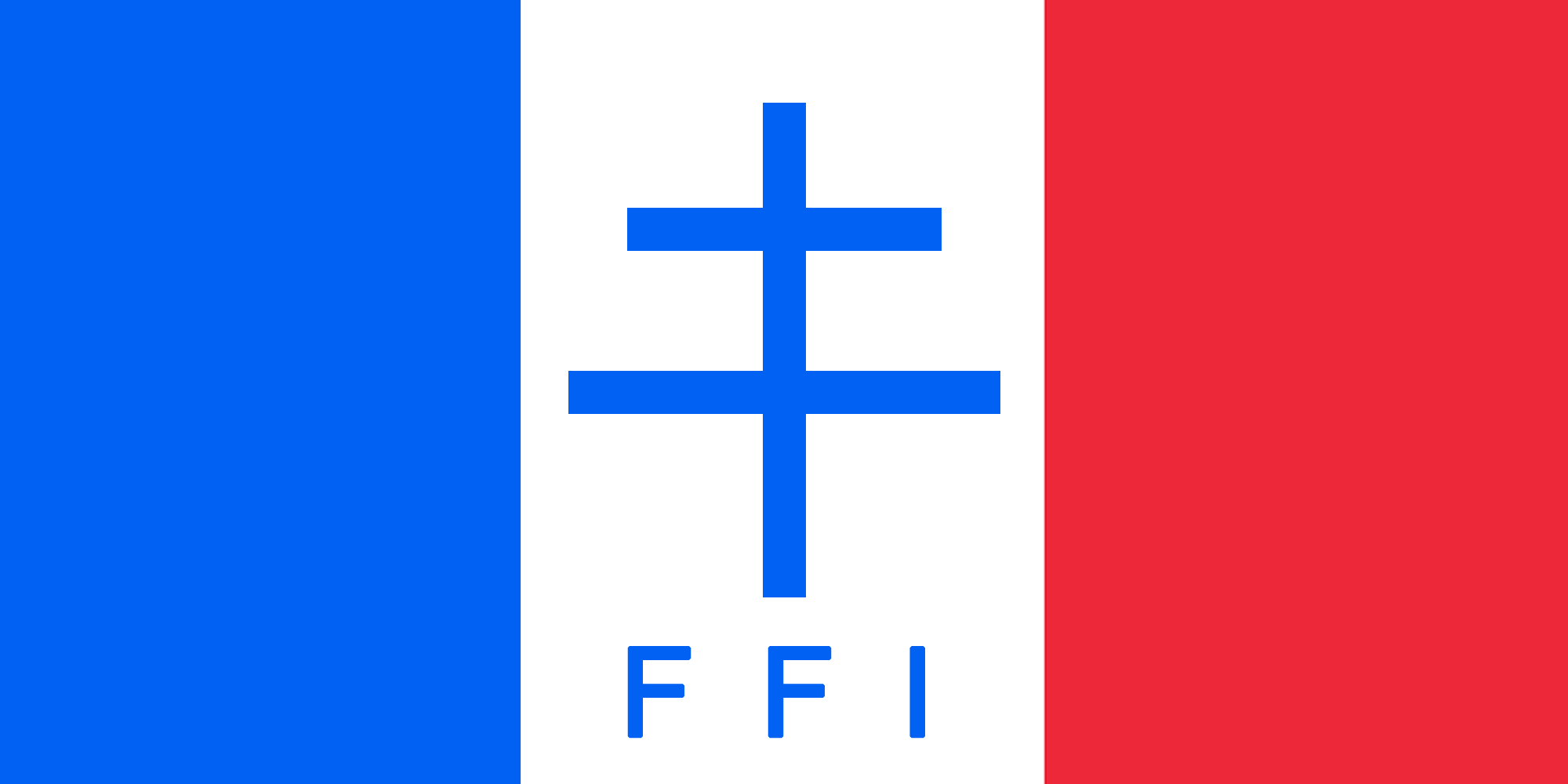
Armband used by the Forces françaises de l'Interieur

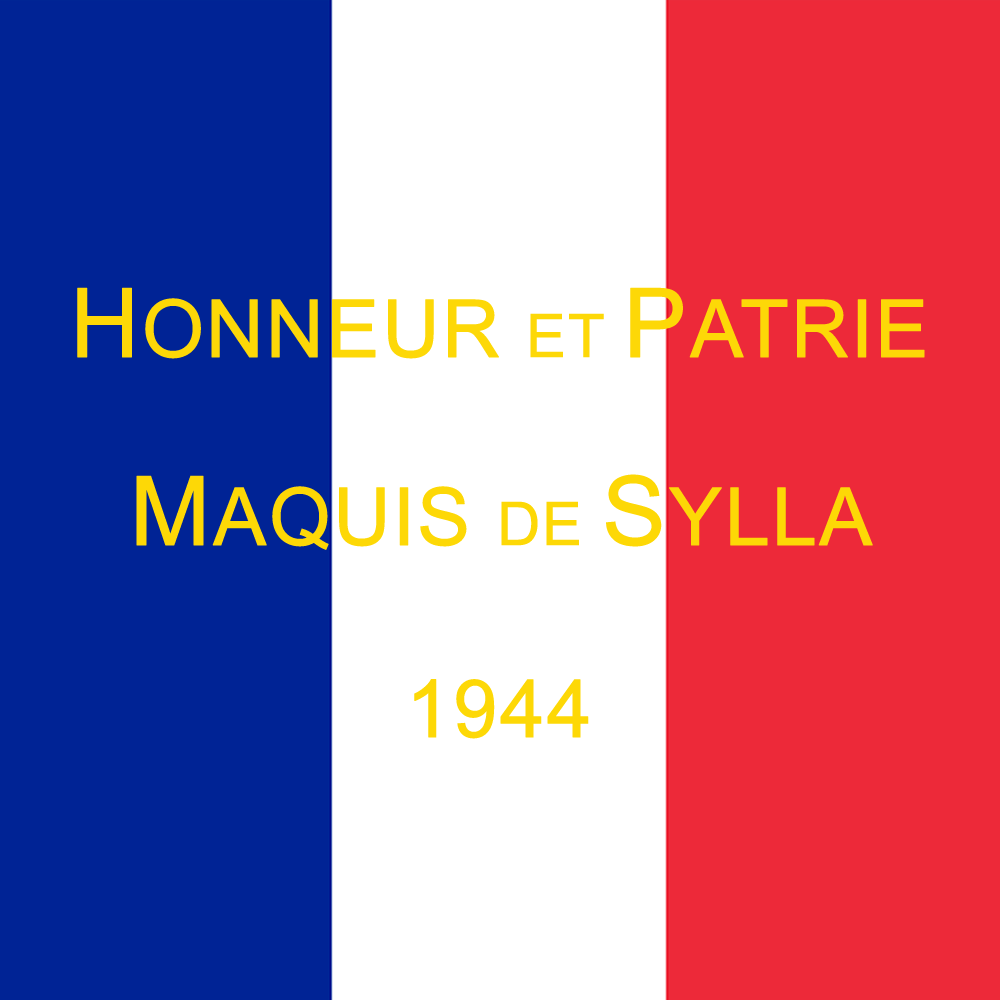
Flag of French Maquis of Sylla

Flag of state of Minnesota with the French motto "L'Étoile du Nord" (1983–2024)

Flag of Alliance-Française de Chicago students

Flag of the City of Detroit

Flag of Baton Rouge, Louisiana

Flag of Republic of Independent Guyana (1886–1887)

=== Current official and unofficial flags of French overseas regions, collectivities, and territories ===
Official flag of Clipperton Island

Unofficial flag of French Guiana

Official flag of French Polynesia

Flag of the Administrator of the French Southern and Antarctic Lands
(2005–present)

Unofficial flag of Guadeloupe
(locally used)

Unofficial flag of Guadeloupe
(locally used, black variant)

Territorial collectivity flag of Martinique

flag of Martinique

Taekwondo flag of Martinique

Unofficial flag of Mayotte

Second official flag of New Caledonia

Unofficial flag of Réunion

Unofficial flag of Saint Barthélemy

Unofficial flag of Saint Martin

Unofficial flag of Saint Pierre and Miquelon

Semi-official flag of Wallis and Futuna

=== Current subnational flags of overseas collectivities and territories ===
Flag of Alo

Flag of Sigave

Flag of Uvea

Flag of the Austral Islands

Flag of the Gambier Islands

Flag of the Marquesas Islands

Flag of the Leeward Islands

Flag of the Tuamotu Archipelago

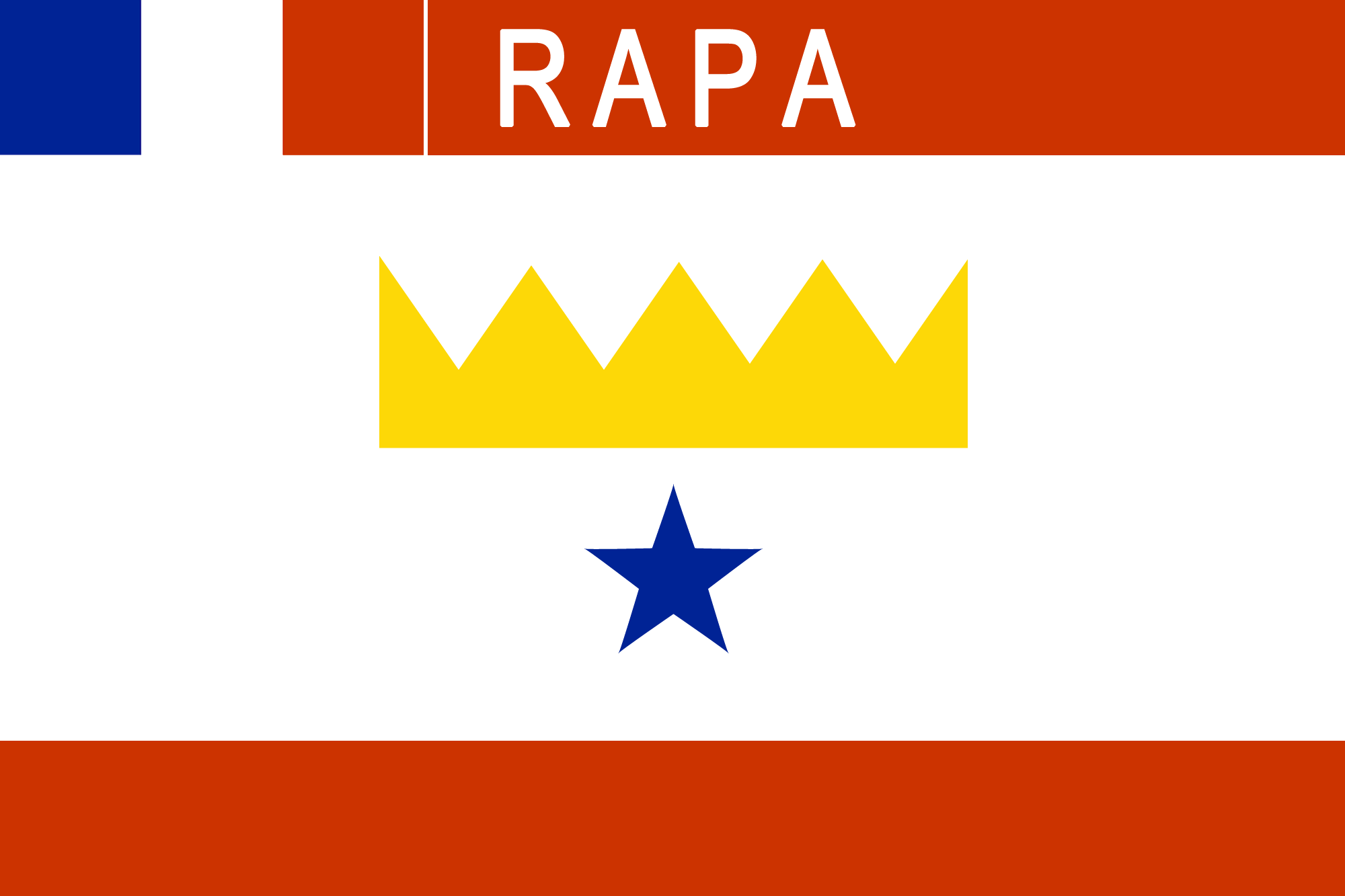
Flag of Rapa (French Polynesia)

=== Other official flags ===
Jack of the Minister of Overseas France

Ensign using by the French aircraft carrier Charles de Gaulle (R91)

Jack of the President and the Prime Minister

Jack of the Minister of Defence

Jack of the chief of staff of the Armies

Jack of the chief of staff of the Navy

Jack of an admiral

Jack of a Vice-amiral d'escadre

Jack of a vice-amiral

Jack of a contre-amiral

Jack of a capitaine de vaisseau commanding a division

Jack of a capitaine de vaisseau commanding a unit

harbour commanding officer (in NATO operations, the "Starboard" is used)

senior merchant navy Captain (if no French warship is present)

Ensign of French's Customs vessels

Flag of the Société Nationale de Sauvetage en Mer

== See also ==
- French colonial empires
- List of French flags
- List of French possessions and colonies
