= Gallery of Polynesian flags =

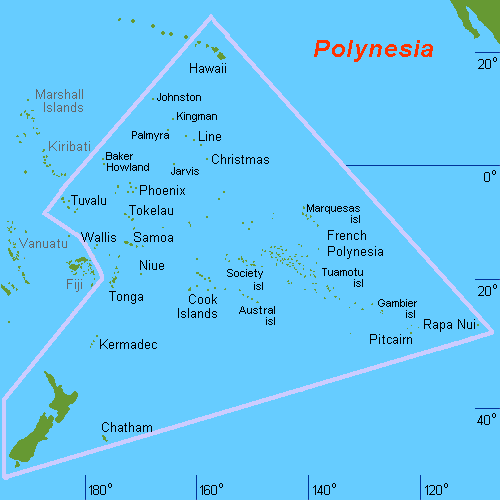
The region generally defined as Polynesia, a sub-region of Oceania

This is a gallery of current and historical flags of Polynesia.

== Flags of sovereign states in Polynesia ==
=== New Zealand ===
See also: List of New Zealand flags

==== National flags ====
Flag of the United Tribes of New Zealand, adopted variant with black fimbriation (1834)

Flag of the United Tribes of New Zealand, gazetted variant with white fimbriation (1834-1840)

Union Jack (1840-1965)

The "Code Signals Flag" (1899-1902, never formally adopted)

Flag of New Zealand (1902-present)

==== Ensigns ====
First naval ensign (1866-1867)

Second naval ensign (1867-1869)

Civil ensign (1903-present)

Current naval ensign (1968-present)

Royal Air Force ensign (1939-present)

Civil air ensign (1938-present)

==== Other flags ====
National Māori flag (Created 1989, formalized 2009)

Royal Standard of New Zealand (1962–2022)

==== See also ====
- New Zealand flag debate
- 2015–2016 New Zealand flag referendums

=== Samoa ===
==== National flags ====
Flag of Samoa (1873-1875)

Flag of Samoa (1875-1879)

Flag of the German Colonial Office, used by the German Empire for the colony of Samoa (1899-1915)

Flag of New Zealand, used during the control of the New Zealand Army (1914–1920)

Flag of the Western Samoa under Mandate with UK (1920–1962)

First flag of Western Samoa, acquired but not approved (1948)

Flag of Western Samoa and later Samoa (24 February 1949–present)

==== Other flags ====
Flag of the Malietoa dynasty in the Kingdom of Samoa (1875-1887, 1889–1900)

Flag of the Tuiaana dynasty in the Kingdom of Samoa (1875-1887, 1889–1900)

Flag of the Tupua Tamasesse in the Kingdom of Samoa (1887-1889)

=== Tonga ===
==== National flags ====
Flag of Tonga (1858–1862)

Tonga (1862–1866)

Flag of Tonga (1875-present)

==== Ensigns ====
Naval ensign (1985-present)

Armed forces ensign (1985-present)

==== Royal standards ====
Royal Standard of Tonga (1862–1875)

Royal Standard of Tonga (1875-present)

=== Tuvalu ===
==== National flags ====
Flag of the Gilbert and Ellice Islands, of which Tuvalu was a part.

Flag of the Ellice Islands (1976-1978)

Flag of Tuvalu (1978-1995)

Flag of Tuvalu (October-December 1995)

Flag of Tuvalu (1996-1997)

Flag of Tuvalu (1997-present)

State flag of Tuvalu (c.e.1997-present)

== Flags of dependencies and other territories in Polynesia ==
=== American Samoa ===
Unincorporated territory of the United States of America

Flag of American Samoa (1960-present)

=== The Cook Islands ===
Associated state of New Zealand

Flag of the Kingdom of Rarotonga between 1858 and 1888

Flag of the Kingdom of Rarotonga between 1888 and 1893

Flag of the Cook Islands Federation from 1893 to June 11, 1901

Flag of the Cook Islands between June 11, 1901 and March 24, 1902

Flag of the Cook Islands from March 24, 1902 to July 23, 1973

Flag of the Cook Islands from July 23, 1973 to August 4, 1979

Flag of the Cook Islands (1979–present)

=== Easter Island ===
Special territory of Chile

Flag of the Kingdom of the Easter Island (1876-1889)

Flag of Easter Island (1889-1902)

Flag of Chile, used for Easter Island (1899-2006)

Flag of Easter Island (2006-present)

=== French Polynesia ===
Overseas collectivity of France

National flag and civil and state ensign of French Polynesia (1794-present)

Civil and state flag of French Polynesia (1984-present)

==== Subdivisions of French Polynesia ====
Flag of the Austral Islands (1985-present)

Flag of the Gambier Islands (1837-present)

Flag of the Leeward Islands (2000-present)

Flag of the Marquesas Islands (1998-present)

Flag of Tuamotus (1975-present)

=== Hawaii ===
State of the United States of America

British Red Ensign (1793–1800)

British Red Ensign (1801–1816)

first flag of Hawaii (1816–1845)

Union Jack (1843, during the period of the Paulet Affair)

Flag of the United States, used after the overthrow of the Kingdom of Hawaii (February 1893 – April 1893)

Sequentially, the flag of the kingdom, territory, and state of Hawaii(1845–Present)

=== Johnston Atoll ===
United States Minor Outlying Islands of the Pacific

Flag of the United States, the only official flag of Johnston Atoll (1858-present)

=== Niue ===
Associated state of New Zealand

Flag of Niue (1975-present)

=== Norfolk Island ===
External territory of Australia

Flag of Norfolk Island (1979-present)

=== Pitcairn Islands ===
External territory of the United Kingdom

Flag of Pitcairn Island (1984-present)

=== Tokelau ===
Dependent territory of New Zealand

Flag of Tokelau (2009-present)

=== Wake Island ===
United States Minor Outlying Island of the Pacific

Flag of the United States, the only official flag of Wake Island (1899-present)

Unofficial but widely accepted flag of Wake Island (c.e.1982-present)

=== Wallis and Futuna ===
French Island Collectivity

Kingdom of Uvea (1842–1860)

Kingdom of Uvea (1860–1886)

Kingdom of Uvea (1886–1887)

Unofficial flag of Wallis and Futuna (1887–1910)

Unofficial flag of Wallis and Futuna (1910–1958)

Unofficial flag of Wallis and Futuna (1958–1985)

Unofficial flag of Wallis and Futuna (1985-present)

Flag of France, the only official flag of Wallis and Futuna (1867-present)

==== Royal standards ====
Royal Standard of Uvea (1837–1858)

Royal Standard of Uvea (1858–1887)

Royal Standard of Alo (c.e. 1999-present)

Royal Standard of Sigave (c.e. 1999-present)

Royal Standard of Uvea (c.e. 1999-present)
