= Flags depicting the Southern Cross =

The Southern Cross or Crux, a constellation visible in the Southern Hemisphere, is depicted on flags and coats of arms of various countries and sub-national entities. This star constellation is visible mostly in the southern hemisphere and it therefore symbolises the southern location of its users.

The term Southern Cross can also refer to the blue saltire as used in various flags of the Confederate States of America in the American Civil War.

This list is an incomplete list and some of the flags in this list might not have official status. Flag proportions may vary between the different flags, and sometimes even vary between different versions of the same flag.

== National flags of countries in the Southern Hemisphere ==
Flag of Australia

Flag of Brazil

Flag of New Zealand

Flag of Papua New Guinea

Flag of Samoa

== Other flags of the Commonwealth of Australia ==
Queen's Personal Australian Flag (1962–2022)

King's Personal Australian Flag

Australian Red Ensign

Royal Australian Air Force Ensign

Australian Civil Air Ensign

Royal Australian Navy Ensign

Flag of the Australian Border Force

Flag of the Australian Capital Territory

Flag of the Northern Territory

Flag of New South Wales

Flag of the governor of New South Wales

Flag of Victoria

Flag of the governor of Victoria

Flag of Christmas Island

Flag of Cocos Islands
(added placeholder image due to copyright issues)

Flag of Dangar Island
(added placeholder image due to copyright issues)

Flag of Scotland Island

Flag of the South Sea Islanders

Eureka Flag

Flag of the Australian Anti-Transportation League

Australian Federation Flag

National Colonial Flag for Australia

Flag of New South Wales (1870–1876)

Flag of South Australia (1870–1876)

Flag of Tasmania (1875)

Flag of Victoria (1870–1877)

Victorian Red Ensign (1870–1877)

== Other flags of the Federative Republic of Brazil ==
Presidential Standard of Brazil

Vice Presidential Standard of Brazil

Flag of the Minister of Defense of Brazil

Flag of Goiás

Flag of Paraná

Flag of São Paulo (state)

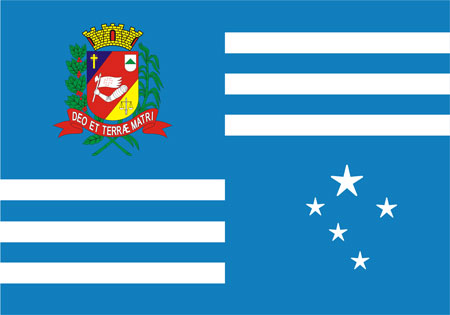
Flag of Assis

Flag of Bom Sucesso do Sul

Flag of Cachoeiro de Itapemirim

Flag of Cruzeiro, São Paulo

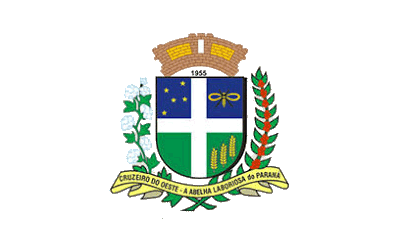
Flag of Cruzeiro do Oeste

Flag of Cruzeiro do Sul, Acre

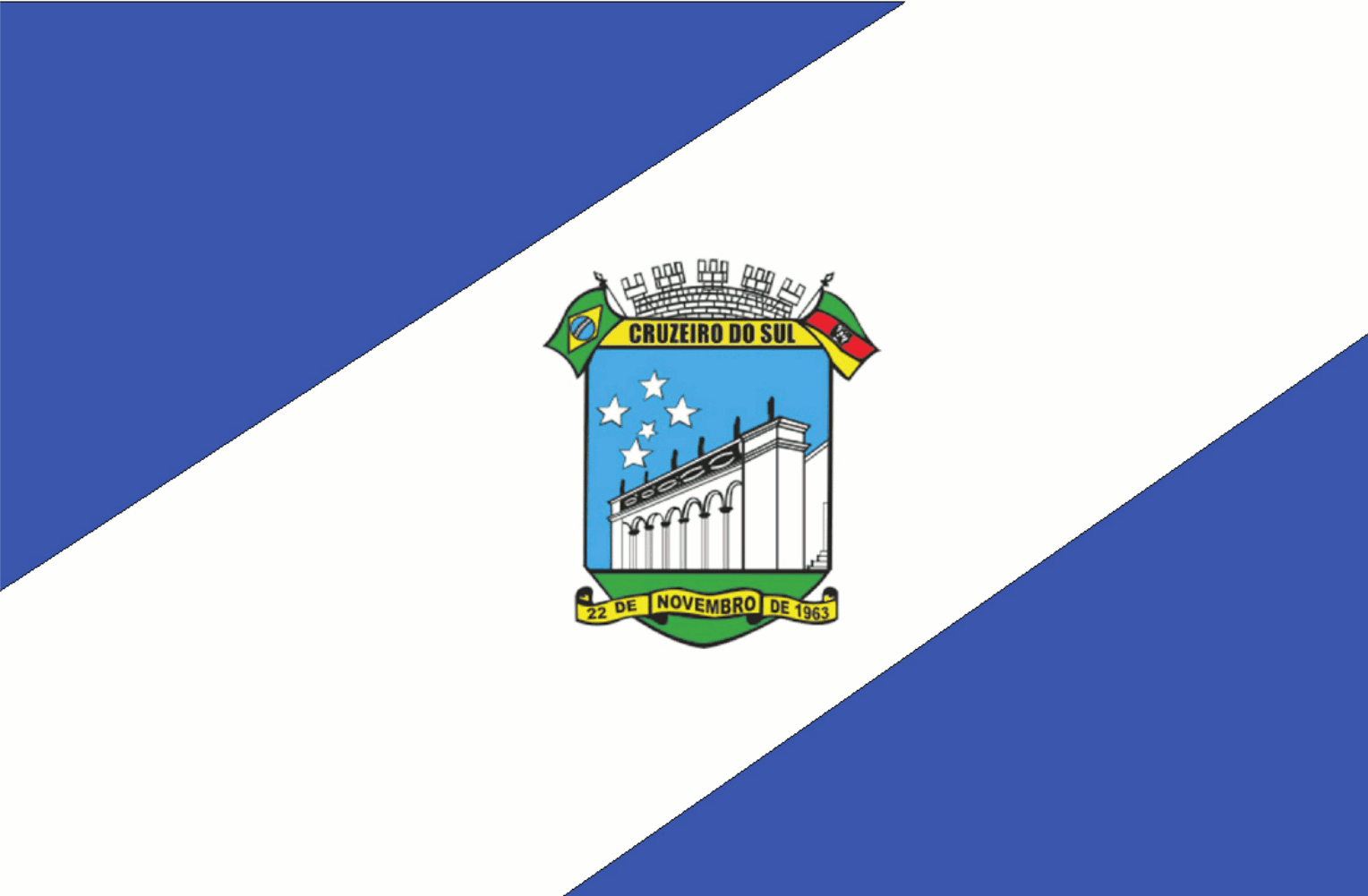
Flag of Cruzeiro do Sul, Rio Grande do Sul

Flag of Diamantino

Flag of Extrema

Flag of Goioerê

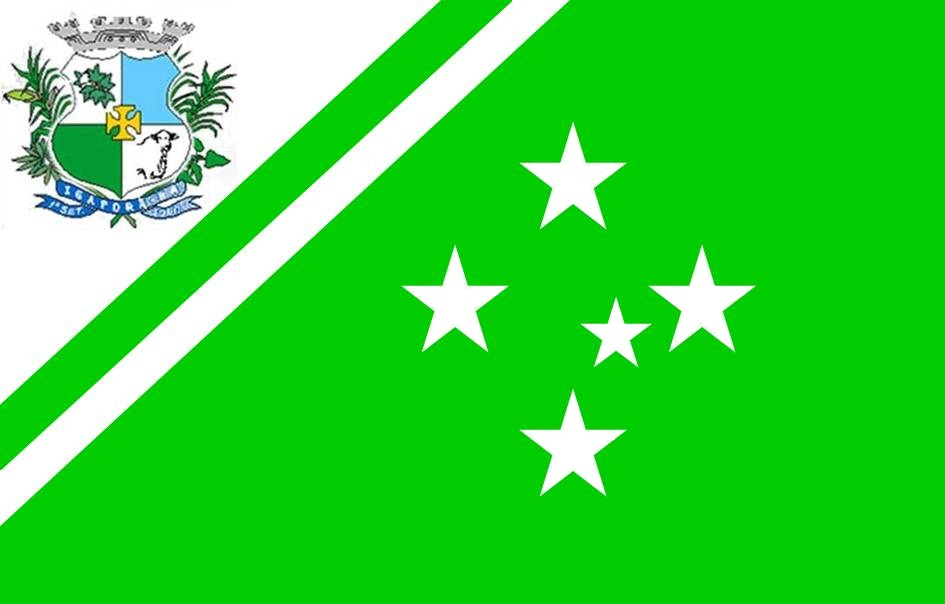
Flag of Igaporã

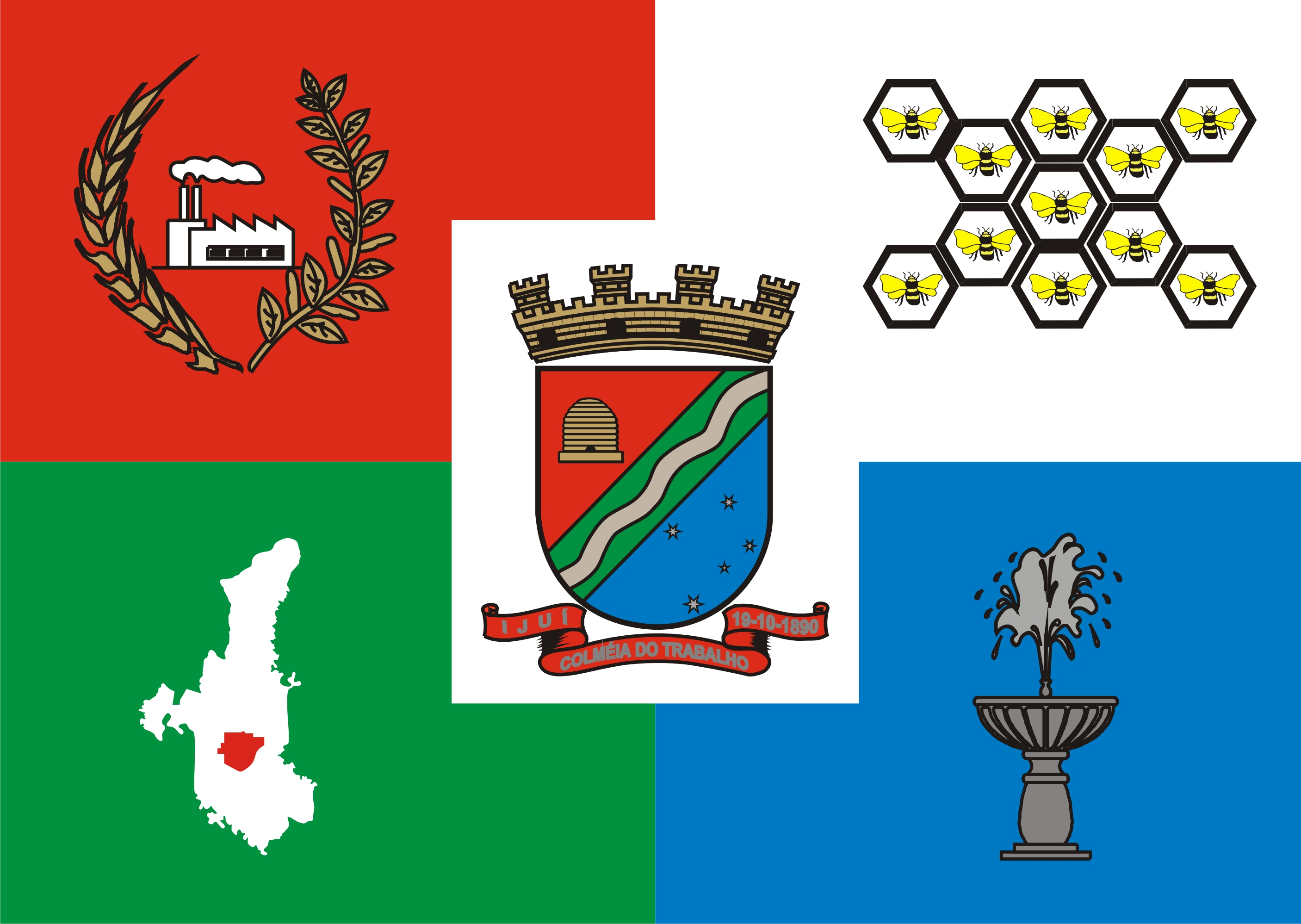
Flag of Ijuí

Flag of Ilha Comprida

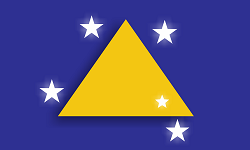
Flag of Itamarandiba

Flag of Itauçu

Flag of Jaguaripe

Flag of Joinville

Flag of Londrina

Flag of Mairiporã

Flag of Maringá

Flag of Monte Santo, Bahia

Flag of Peruíbe

Flag of Pindamonhangaba

Flag of Quaraí

Flag of Rio Claro, Rio de Janeiro

Flag of Tefé

== Other flags of the Realm of New Zealand ==
Queen's Personal New Zealand Flag (1962–2022)

Flag of the governor-general

Flag of Niue

Flag of Tokelau

New Zealand Red Ensign

Royal New Zealand Navy Ensign

New Zealand Civil Air Ensign

New Zealand Police Ensign

Burgee of the Royal New Zealand Yacht Squadron

Ensign of the Royal New Zealand Yacht Squadron

Flag of Action Zealandia

== Other flags of Papua New Guinea ==
Papua New Guinea Naval Ensign

Flag of East New Britain Province

Flag of New Ireland Province

Flag of Simbu Province

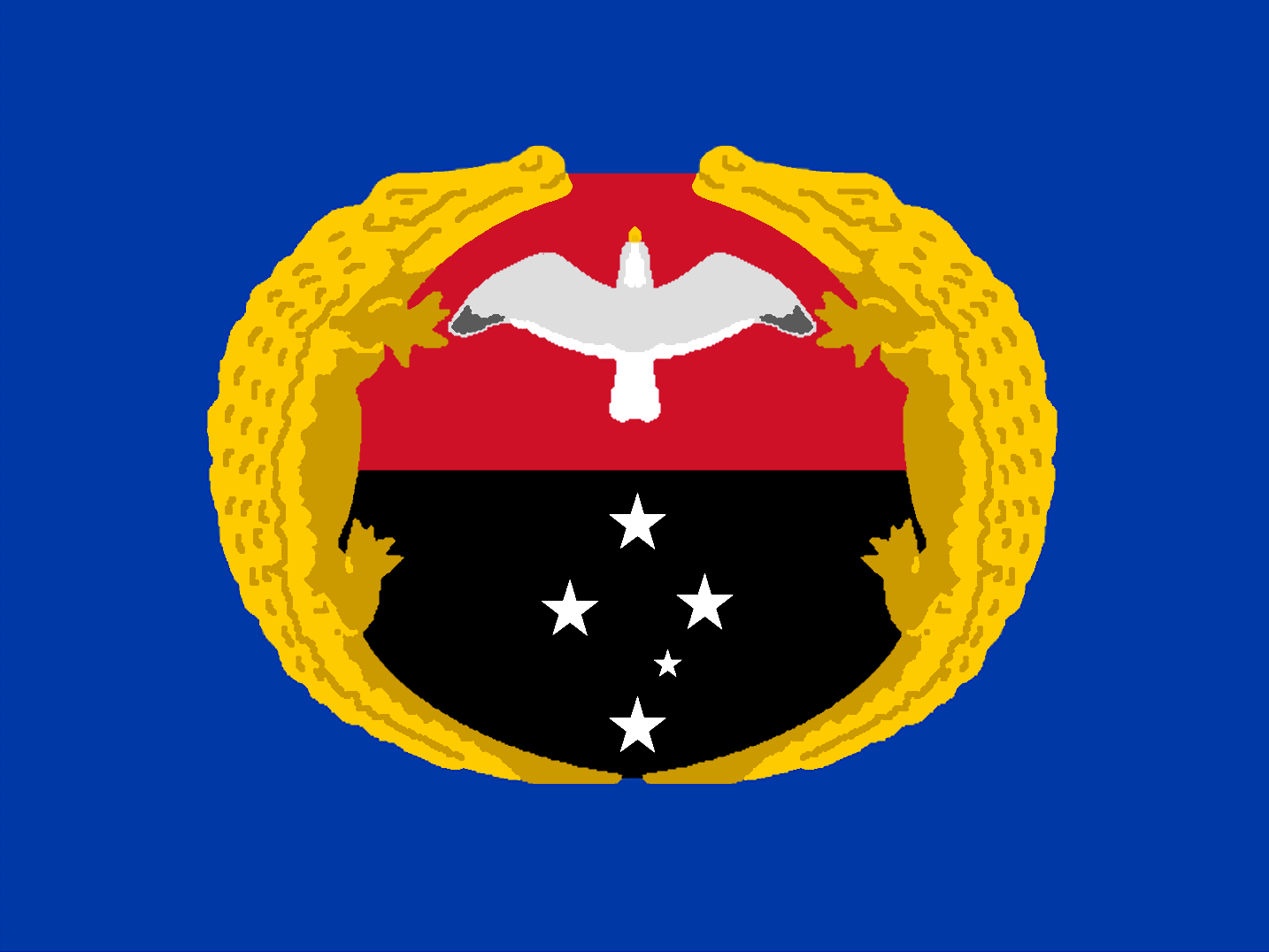
Flag of Gulf Province

Flag of West New Britain Province

Flag of Western Province

== Other flags in South America ==
Flag of the Southern Common Market (Spanish)

Flag of the Southern Common Market (Portuguese)

Flag of Coronel Dorrego Partido, Argentina

Flag of El Chaltén, Argentina

Flag of Santa Cruz Province, Argentina

Flag of Tierra del Fuego Province, Argentina

Flag of Concón, Chile

Flag of Coquimbo Region, Chile

Flag of Los Lagos Region, Chile

Flag of Magallanes Region, Chile

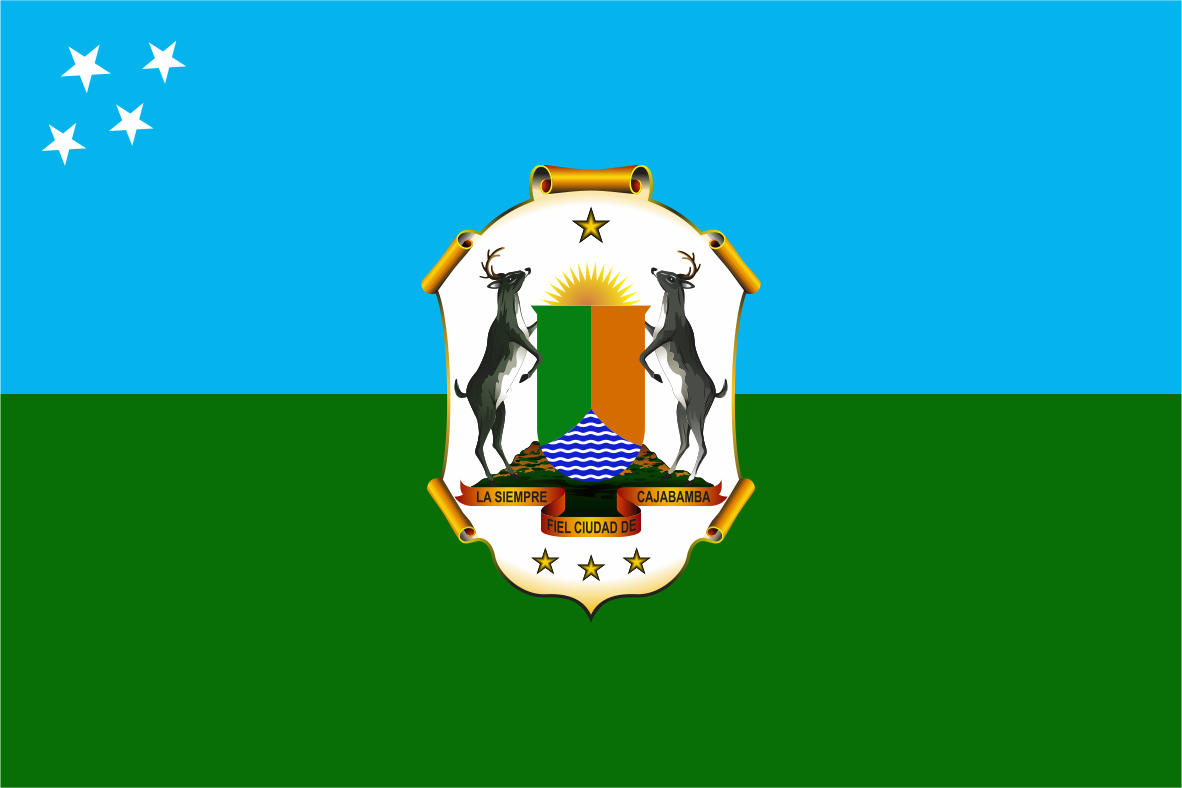
Flag of Cajabamba, Peru

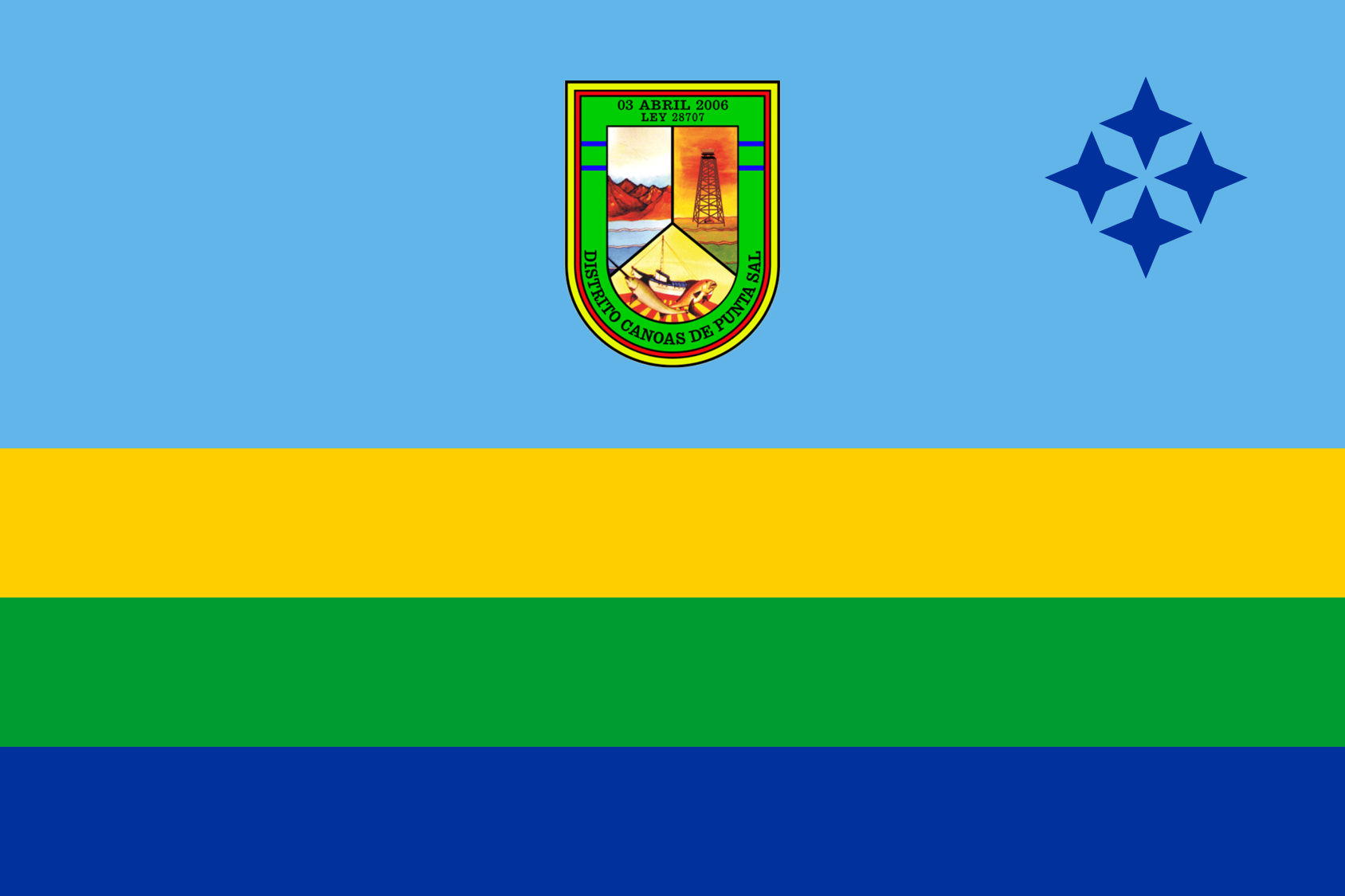
Flag of Canoas de Punta Sal District, Peru

Flag of Paita, Peru

Flag of the Colonia Department, Uruguay

== Other flags with the Southern Cross ==
Olympic Flag of Australasia

Flag of the German East Africa Company

Flag of the Reichskolonialbund, often misattributed to New Swabia

Flag of Sonsorol, Palau

Flag of SANDF Joint Operations Division

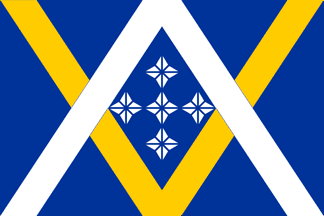
Flag of the Southern African Vexillological Association

English Australian heritage flag

Scottish Australian heritage flag

Welsh Australian heritage flag

Irish Australian heritage flag

Cornish Australian heritage flag

Manx Australian heritage flag

Adnyamathanha peoples flag

Aṉangu peoples flag

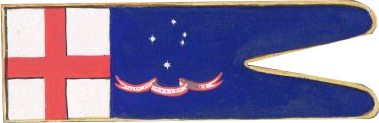
Sledge flag used by Louis Bernacchi during the Discovery Expedition (1901–1904)

British Empire flag

Flag of the Pan-American Exposition (1901)

== See also ==
- List of country subdivision flags in Oceania
- List of Antarctic flags
- Nordic Cross Flag
- Union Flag
- Stateless nation
- The United Nations
- Unrepresented Nations and Peoples Organization (UNPO)
- Flags of subnational entities
- List of cultural flags
- Gallery pages of flags of country subdivisions
