= Flag of French Polynesia =

French Polynesia
- Flag of French Polynesia
- Use: Civil and state flag
- Proportion: 2:3
- Adopted: 23 November 1984; 41 years ago
- Design: Two red horizontal bands encase a wide white band in a 1:2:1 ratio, with the coat of arms centred on the white stripe
- Le Tricolore
- Flag of the French Republic
- Use: National flag, civil and state ensign
- Proportion: 2:3
- Adopted: 15 February 1794

The flag of French Polynesia was adopted in 1984. It is composed of two red horizontal bands, which encase a wide white band twice as wide as each red band, with the Emblem of French Polynesia in the white band's center.

Under the organic law on the status of French Polynesia, it is one of the "distinctive signs allowing the personality" of the country (fenua in Tahitian) to be marked "in official public events alongside the national emblem and the signs of the Republic".

== Design ==
Two red horizontal bands encase a wide white band in a 1:2:1 ratio; centred on the white band is the emblem of French Polynesia as a 0.43m diameter disk with a blue and white wave pattern depicting the sea on the lower half and a gold and white ray pattern depicting the sun on the upper half; a Polynesian canoe rides on the wave pattern; the canoe has a crew of five represented by five stars that symbolize the five island groups; red and white are traditional Polynesian colours.

=== Colours ===
Scheme	Red	White	Blue	Yellow
Refs				
Pantone (paper)	185 C	Safe	286 C	116 C
HEX	#e4002b	#FFFFFF	#0033a0	#FFCD00
CMYK	0, 100, 81, 11	0, 0, 0, 0	100, 68, 0, 37	0, 10, 98, 0
RGB	227, 0, 43	255, 255, 255	0, 51, 161	255, 205, 0

== History ==
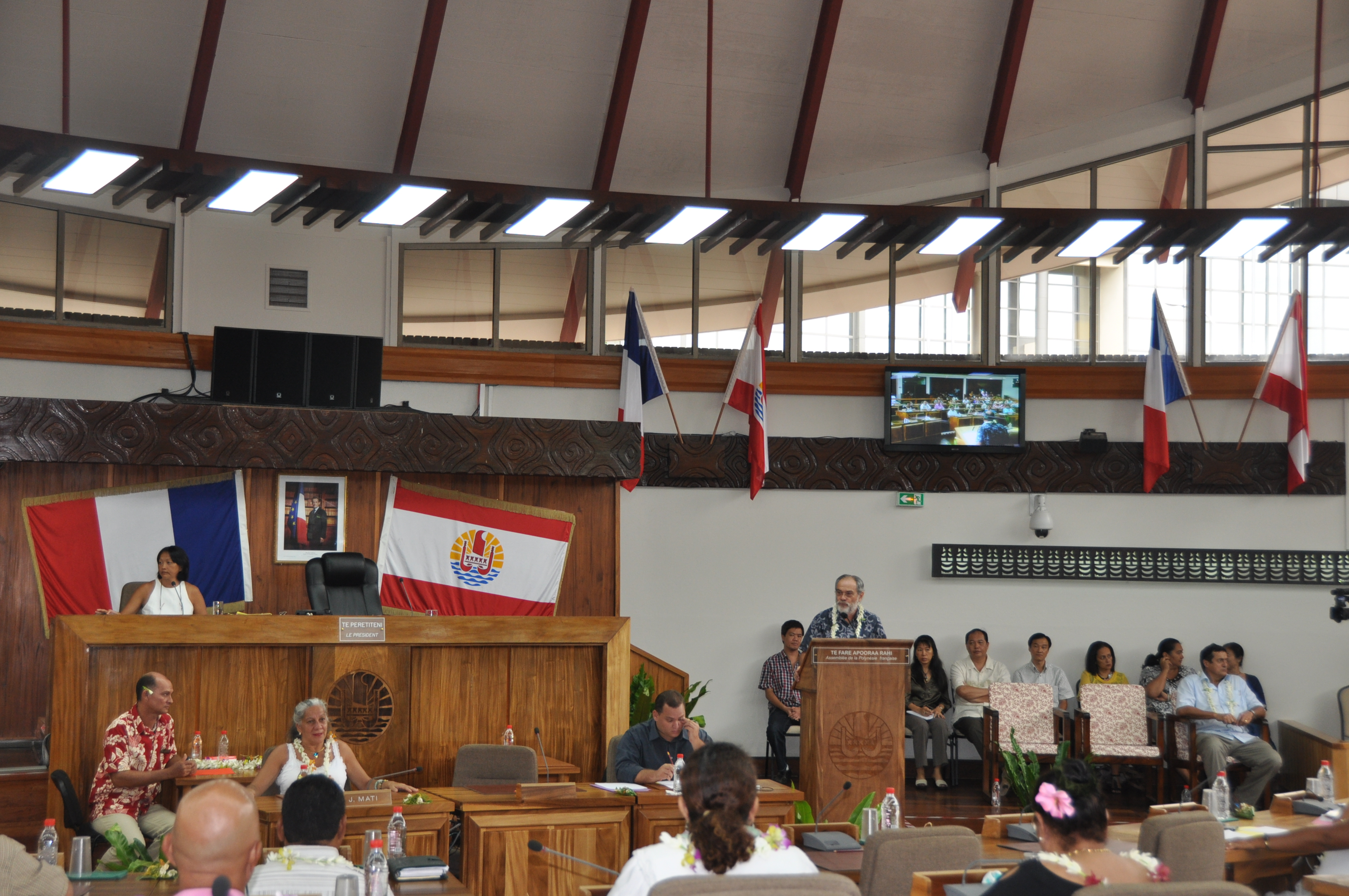
Assembly of French Polynesia with flags of French Polynesia and France.

Flag of Kingdom of Tahiti, used 1788–1843

The flag was designed by Alfred Chalons, a technology and plastic arts teacher at La Mennais high school, who entered the competition with the support of his students. The flag was presented to the Assembly of French Polynesia on November 20, 1984 with the following words:

Pour la Polynésie ce drapeau symbolisera, enfin et surtout, pour les prochaines générations, l'esprit de liberté, de responsabilité et d'initiative d'un peuple tourné vers l'avenir et attaché, au travers des valeurs traditionnelles, à sa dignité et à son épanouissement.

For Polynesia this flag will symbolize, finally and above all, for future generations, the spirit of freedom, responsibility and initiative of a people turned towards the future and attached, through traditional values, to its dignity and its development.

It is inspired by the flag of the Kingdom of Tahiti, (1788–1880) which is the same save for the emblem of French Polynesia, which was adopted by letter of Governor Jean Chastenet de Géry dated 14 September 1939.

The assembly approved this emblem by resolution number 84-1030 AT, in its session of November 23, 1984, in application of law number 84-820 of September 6, 1984 relating to the status of the territory of French Polynesia.

Its use is officially regulated by a decree of December 4, 1985.

== Use ==
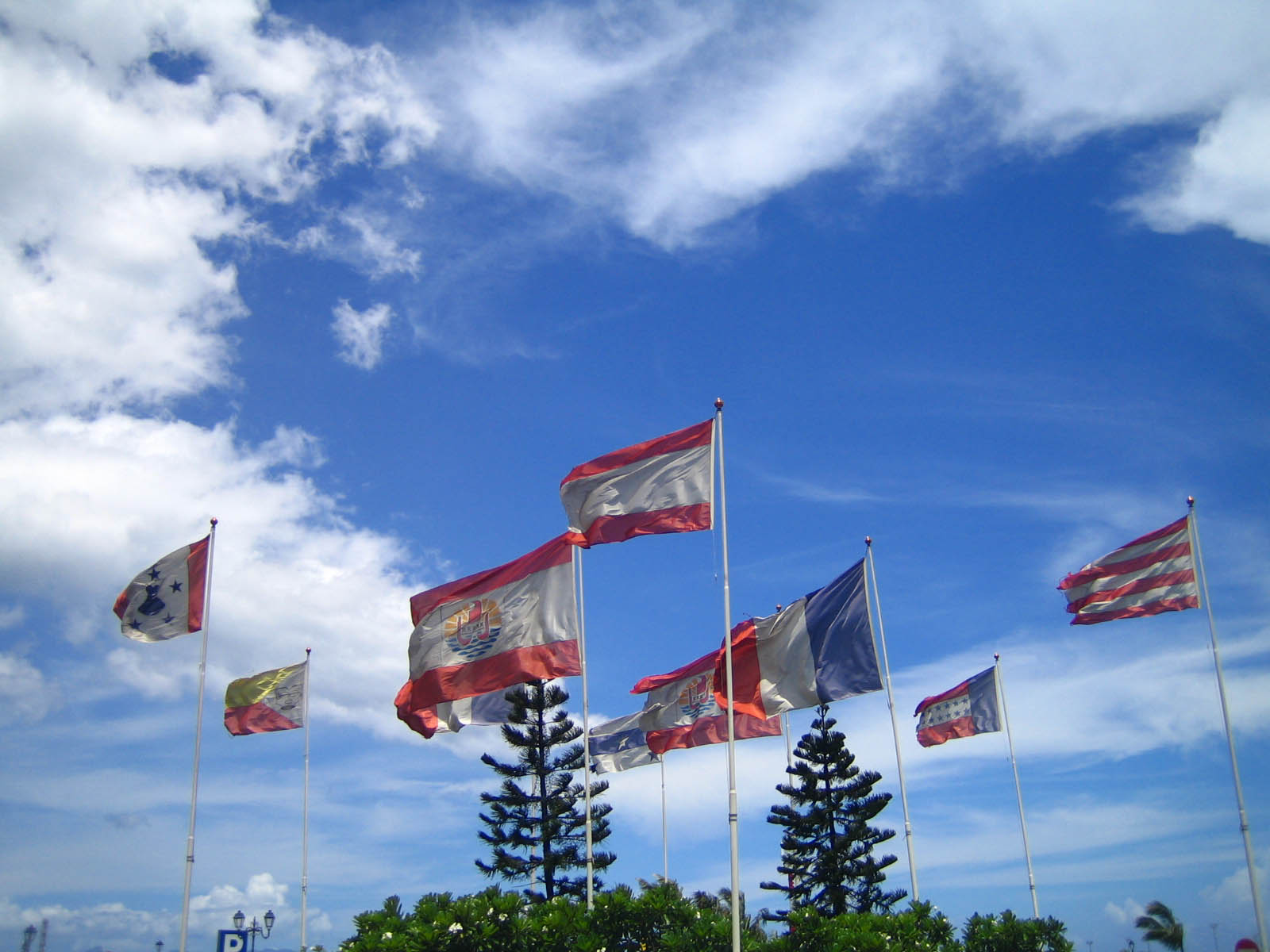
The flag of French Polynesia and of France flying alongside the flags of the component archipelagos in Pape'ete.

According to the articles of adoption, the flag of French Polynesia must be displayed with the French tricolour, and may be displayed with the flags of the component archipelagos. The French Polynesian flag must be displayed to the left of the French flag, and the flag of the archipelago must be displayed to its right. Under the organic law on the status of French Polynesia, it is one of the "distinctive signs allowing the personality" of the country (fenua in Tahitian) to be marked "in official public events alongside the national emblem and the signs of the Republic".

== Flags of component archipelagos ==
Flag of the Austral Islands

Flag of the Gambier Islands

Flag of the Marquesas Islands

Flag of the Leeward Islands

Sports Flag of the Leeward Islands

Flag of the Tuamotu Archipelago

=== Flags of the Society Islands ===
==== Leeward Islands ====
Flag of Bora Bora

Flag of Raiatea

Flag of Huahine

==== Windward Islands ====
Flag of Tahiti

Flag of Moorea-Maiao

=== Flags of the Tuamotu Archipelago ===
Flag of Hao

Flag of Makatea

Flag of Reao Pukaruha

=== Flags of the Austral Islands ===
Flag of Rapa Iti

Flag of Rimatara

Flag of Rurutu

Flag of Tubuai

Flag of Raivavae

== See also ==
- Flag of France
- Coat of arms of French Polynesia
- Gallery of Polynesian flags
