= Coat of arms of French Polynesia =

- Armiger: French Polynesia
- Adopted: 23 November 1984; 40 years ago

The coat of arms of French Polynesia consists of an outrigger depicted in a disc over a stylized emblem of the sun and the sea. The emblem is placed prominently in the middle of the flag of French Polynesia.

== Description ==
Adopted 23 November 1984 by the Assembly of French Polynesia, at the same time as the flag in which the arms have centre place, the coat of arms shows a stylized Polynesian sailing canoe, a Tahitian and national traditional symbol. It is encircled by a rising sun in the upper half, and by waves in the lower one. The five asterisks represents the five Archipelagos: the Society Islands, the Tuamotus, the Gambier Islands, the Austral Islands and the Marquesas.

== Historical Emblem ==
Coat of Arms of Établissements français de l'Océanie (Polynésie Française)

The arms of Polynésie Française were adopted by letter of Governor Jean Chastenet de Géry dated 14 September 1939.

== See also ==
- Flag of French Polynesia
- National emblem of France
