= New Zealand White Ensign =

Flag used by the Royal New Zealand Navy

- Use: Naval ensign
- Adopted: New Zealand White Ensign Regulations 1968
- Design: White field defaced with the stars of the Southern Cross, in red, and with the Union Flag in the canton.

The New Zealand White Ensign (also known as the New Zealand Naval Ensign or the Royal New Zealand Navy Ensign) is a naval ensign used by ships of the Royal New Zealand Navy (RNZN) from 1968. Based on the Royal Navy's White Ensign, it features the Southern Cross from the New Zealand national flag in place of the Saint George's Cross. One of the earliest flags associated with the country, that used by the United Tribes of New Zealand, was a white ensign. This was replaced by the Union Flag when New Zealand became a British colony. A blue ensign with the Southern Cross was introduced for ships of the colonial government in 1867 and this soon became a de facto national flag. Ships in New Zealand naval service wore the Royal Navy's White Ensign until 1968 when the distinct New Zealand White Ensign was introduced. The ensign was implemented out of a desire to distinguish New Zealand vessels from those of the Royal Navy and this decision is regarded as an important step in the development of the RNZN.

The New Zealand White Ensign is worn by commissioned RNZN vessels and shore establishments during daylight hours. It is also flown from the top of the Auckland Harbour Bridge to mark the anniversary of the founding of the RNZN. The right to fly the ensign was granted to flag officers of the Royal New Zealand Yacht Squadron upon their centenary in 1971 and it may also be used by New Zealand examination vessels.

== History ==
The national flag of New Zealand, a blue ensign

A version of a white ensign was adopted as the flag of the United Tribes of New Zealand, a confederation of Māori tribes on the North Island, by a vote in 1834 and approved by the British resident James Busby. This flag had a red Saint George's Cross and the upper canton was blue with a red cross and four eight-pointed stars in each quadrant. In 1840 following the signing of the 1840 Treaty of Waitangi between the British and many Māori chiefs. The British Union Flag became the flag of New Zealand and its ship followed the system of British ensigns.

The British parliament's Colonial Naval Defence Act 1865 brought vessels of the colonial government under the control of the Royal Navy. The Admiralty required such vessels to fly their own distinctive Blue Ensigns, rather than using the British version. It took until 1867 for New Zealand to comply with this act, adding the red letters "NZ" to the standard ensign. This was replaced in 1869 by a version with the Southern Cross in red stars on the field. This flag was intended for use at sea only but soon came to be used on land as a de facto national flag. The Blue Ensign was adopted by New Zealand officially as the national flag by the New Zealand Parliament in 1902. New Zealand Minister for Education William Campbell Walker, in a 1900 New Zealand House of Representatives debate, claimed that a version of the White Ensign, with a red cross on a white field with four red stars, had earlier been considered as a candidate for the national flag but had not been adopted because of opposition from the Royal Navy which claimed exclusivity over the White Ensign.

The White Ensign of the Royal Navy, worn by vessels of the Royal New Zealand Navy from 1941 to 1968

During the New Zealand Wars the colony of New Zealand operated small vessels in a military capacity, the first being a gunboat purchased in 1846. These unofficial vessels did not wear a naval ensign as they were not commissioned and instead wore a Union Flag. The New Zealand Naval Forces were established in 1913 but only as a division of the Royal Navy; its ships therefore wore the usual Royal Navy White Ensign. In 1921 the New Zealand vessels were granted permission to wear the national flag as a jack but, as jacks are not worn at sea, this meant ships in battle were not readily identifiable as belonging to New Zealand. The Royal New Zealand Navy (RNZN) was established as a separate force in 1941 but, due to the ongoing Second World War, there was no discussion about granting it a unique ensign. The RNZN continued to use the British White Ensign including on active service during the 1950–1953 Korean War and the 1948–1960 Malayan Emergency.

The Royal Australian Navy (RAN) also flew the White Ensign. Its entry into the Vietnam War in 1962 led to this being replaced by its own unique white ensign in 1967. This was partly to avoid embarrassment to the British government, which was not involved in the war, and partly from an Australian government desire for its vessels to be distinctive. New Zealand joined the war in 1964, though it sent no naval vessels into the conflict area. The RNZN museum suggests that the RAN's adoption of a distinctive white ensign inspired a similar change in the RNZN; in 1967 Mr E.W. Jones of the Hydrographic Branch was appointed to design one. This was approved by Elizabeth II and adopted by the New Zealand White Ensign Regulations 1968, an Order in Council made by Governor-General Arthur Porritt on 10 June 1968. The adoption of a unique white ensign has been noted as an important step in the development of the RNZN.

== Description ==
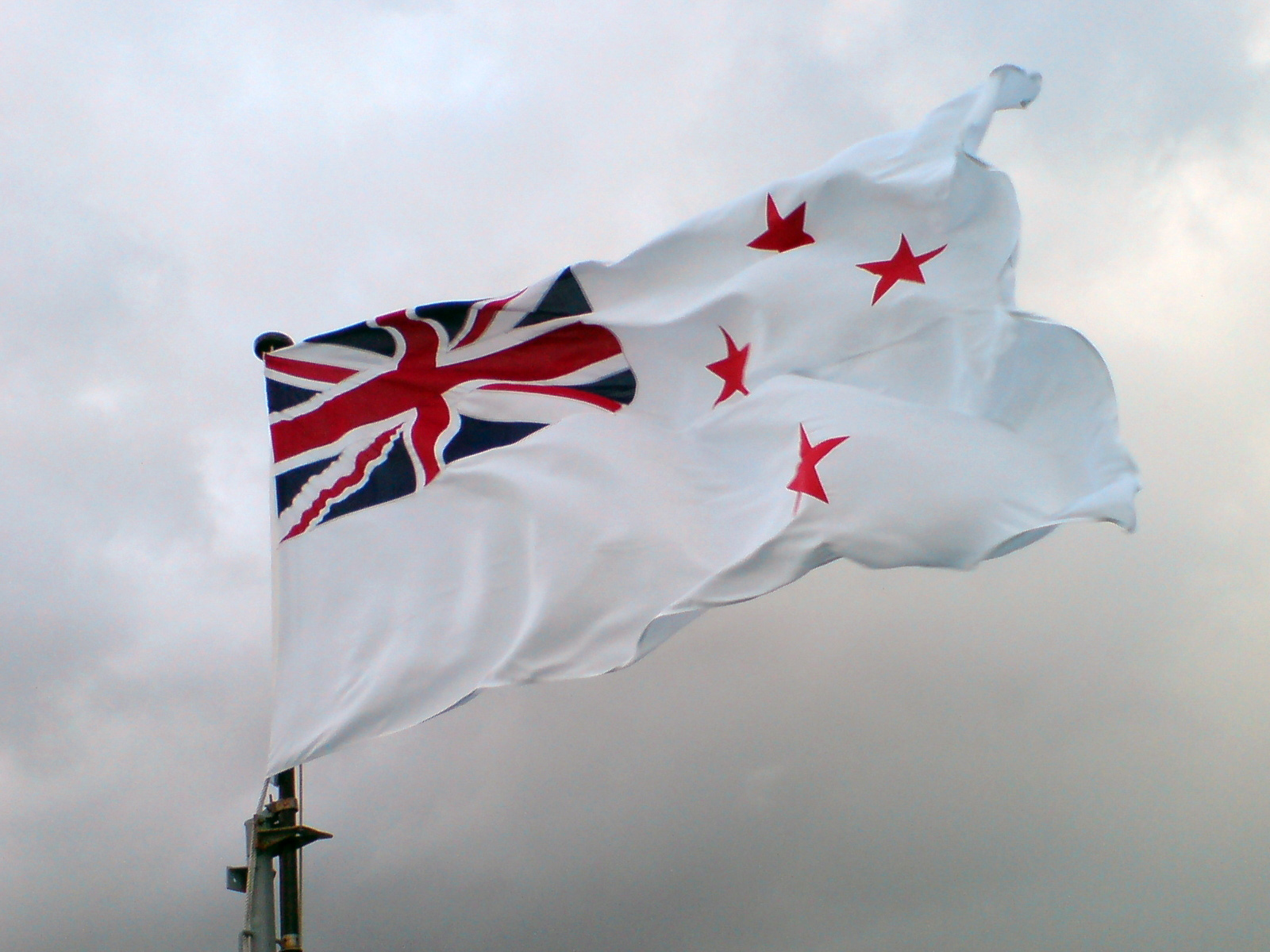
The New Zealand White Ensign as worn by the frigate Te Kaha

The New Zealand White Ensign, as defined in the 1968 regulations, is identical to the national flag except that the field is white instead of blue and the white border to the stars is replaced with red. In common with the national flag the White Ensign is 1:2 in ratio and has the British Union flag in the canton. The colours used in the ensign are white (Pantone SAFE), red (Pantone 186C) and blue (Pantone 280C). The four stars of the Southern Cross are depicted with five points.

== Use ==
The 1968 regulations allow the White Ensign to be worn by commissioned vessels of the RNZN and flown at naval establishments. In current RNZN practice the White Ensign is worn only during daylight hours but in times of war it is worn continuously. All RNZN vessels are required to wear the flag, unless authorised by the Chief of Defence Force. When alongside, anchored or secured to a buoy vessels of the RNZN wear the White Ensign at the stern and the national flag as a jack at the bow.

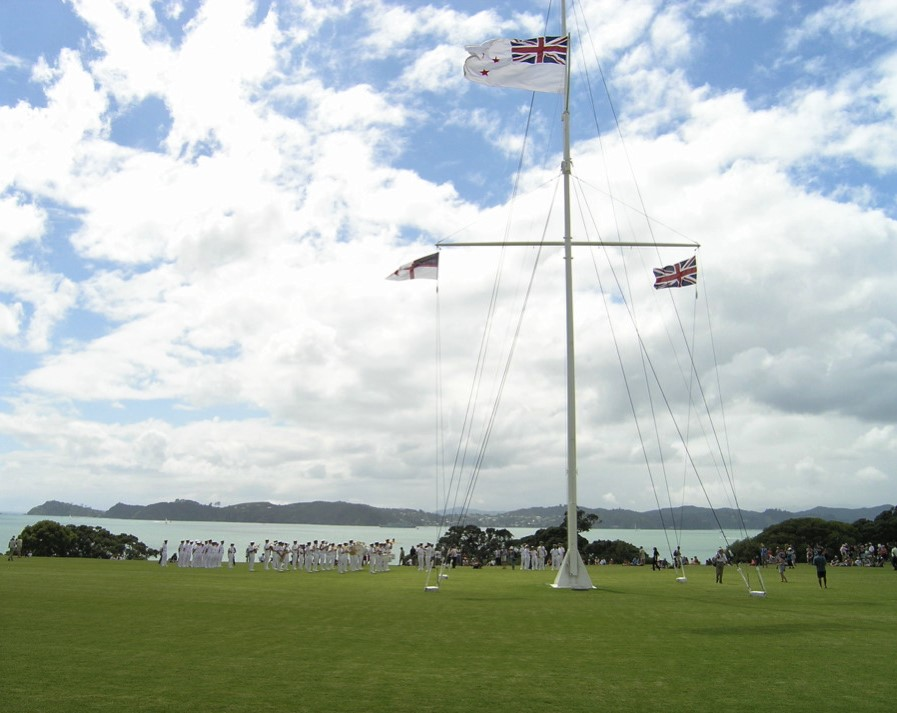
The flagstaff at Waitangi, with the NZ White Ensign at centre.

The White Ensign has been flown from the top of Auckland Harbour Bridge annually on 1 October since 2016 to mark the day the RNZN was founded. It is also flown on 6 February, alongside the Union Flag, United Tribes flag and the national flag, at Waitangi to mark Waitangi Day. New Zealand examination vessels are also entitled to wear the White Ensign, though no such vessels have operated since the disbanding of the Examination Service in 1944. In 1971, to commemorate the centenary of the Royal New Zealand Yacht Squadron, its flag officers (the three senior committee members: commodore, vice-commodore and rear-commodore) were granted the right to wear the White Ensign on vessels on which they are skipper; other member's vessels wear the squadron's blue ensign.

RNZN Queen's Colour under Queen Elizabeth II

In 1937 the RNZN was granted a King's colour, which serves a similar purpose to the colours of army regiments. During the reign of Queen Elizabeth II, the colour was a variation of the White Ensign with more square proportions and the addition of a device showing the crowned royal cypher of Elizabeth II encircled by the emblem and motto of the Order of the Garter. The King's colour originally showed a St George's Cross, in line with the Royal Navy White Ensign. When the colour was renewed in 1970 the design was changed to show the southern cross, in line with the New Zealand White Ensign.
