= Flag of the Gambier Islands =

Gambier Islands
- Flag of the Gambier Islands
- Proportion: 2:3
- Adopted: 1837
- Design: Three horizontal stripes of equal width in the order white-blue-white charged with a blue star in each corner and a white star in the middle.
- Designed by: Armand Mauruc

The Flag of the Gambier Islands is the flag of the Gambier Islands of French Polynesia in the Pacific Ocean, administered by France. It was created in 1832 and adopted in 1837.

== Description ==
The flag of the Gambier Islands is divided into three horizontal bands, with white on the top and bottom and blue in the middle. There is a blue five-pointed star in each of the four corners and one white five-pointed star in the center. Each of the stars represent one of the major islands in the group, with the blue stars representing Mangareva, Taravai, Aukena, and Akamaru, and the white star representing the islet Temoe, which is geographically distant from the others. The blue represents the sea while the white represents purity, and evangelism. The blue and white may also relate to the distinctive color of the local churches.

The flag was originally described as "sky blue," but the ruling party of French Polynesia has declared azure the official color. This is likely because sky blue is associated with the opposition party and independence movement.

== History ==
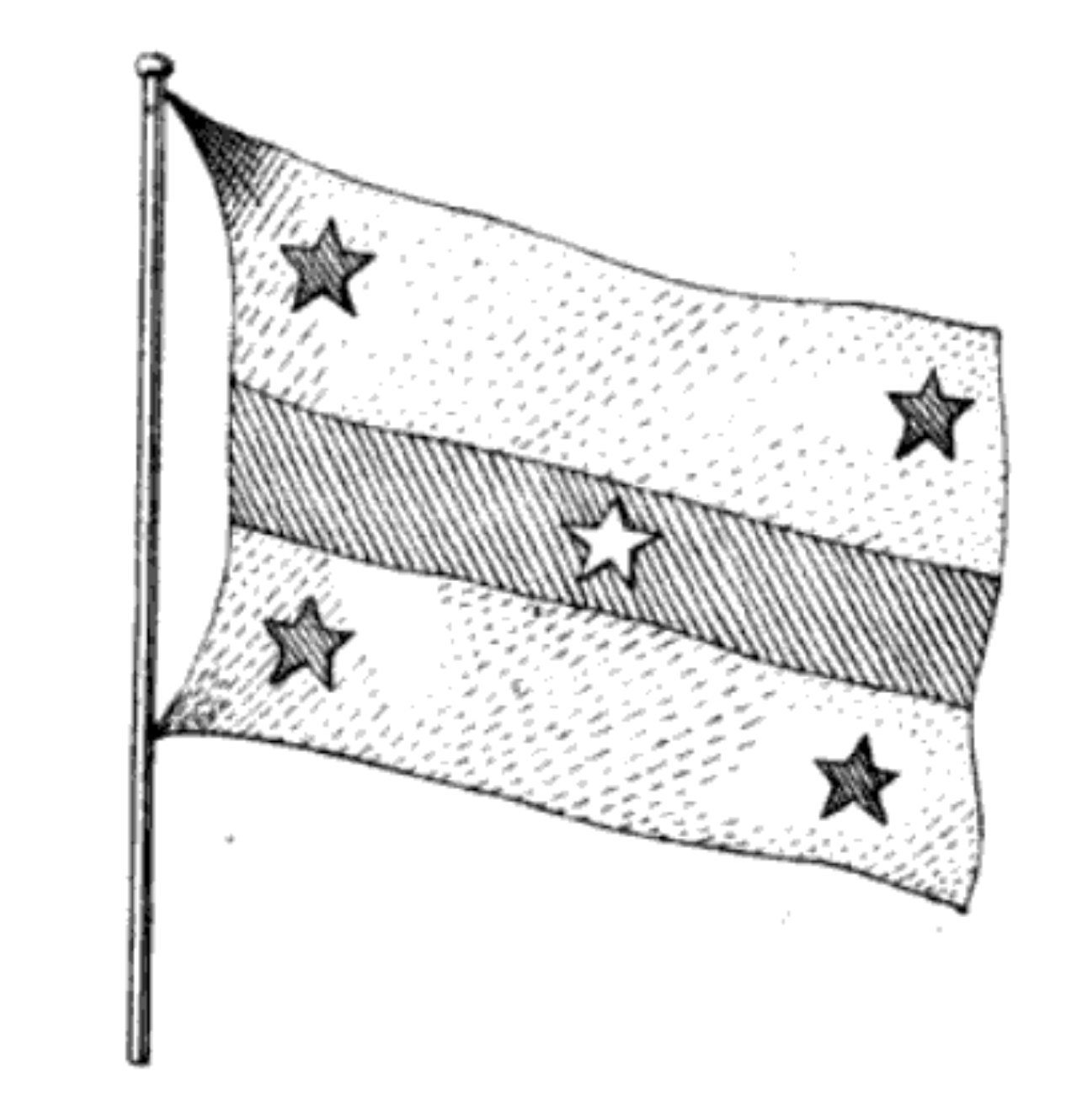
Design of the flag of the Gambier Islands from the 1872 book "Voyage aux îles Gambier (archipel de Mangarèva)"

Conflict between Chile and Peru in the early 1830s disrupted trade in the Pacific. A mother-of-pearl trader named Armand Mauruc was flying under a Chilean flag but, wishing to avoid conflict, requested King Maputeoa adopt the Gambier national flag, which he did. Mauruc is sometimes credited as the creator, but French explorer Jules Dumont d'Urville likely designed the flag for the island of Mangareva some years before it was adopted for the Gambier Islands.

The flag was used for the Gambier Islands until 1844, when the islands were placed under French protectorate and the French tricolor became its official symbol. The French flag remained the only official symbol of the Gambier Islands until 4 December 1985 when the government ruled flags of the archipelagos and islands could flown next to the national and territorial flag.
