= Flag of the Austral Islands =

Flag

Flag of the Austral Islands

The Flag of the Austral Islands is the flag representing the Austral Islands, a constituent of French Polynesia in the Pacific Ocean administered by France.

== Description ==
The flag has a ratio of 2:3 and is divided into three vertical stripes: red, white and red, with the proportions 1:3:1. In the white central stripe is a blue emblem surrounded by five stars representing the five high islands that constitute the Austral Islands: Rūrutu, Tubua'i, Rimatara, Ra'ivāvae and Rapa. The central emblem represents a penu, a traditional carved rock or coral tool common across the archipelago which is used to crush food, similar to a pestle. The red stripes symbolize French Polynesia, of which the archipelago is a part, and blue symbolizes the sea. The colors are prescribed as red Pantone 185c and blue Pantone 286c.

On 4 December 1985, the Territorial Government decreed that the flag of the archipelagos and islands of French Polynesia may be flown next to the French Polynesian Territorial flag and the French National flag.

=== Historical flag ===
Old flag of the Austral Islands

The former flag of the Austral Islands has a white vertical stripe placed along the hoist, covering 1/3 of the flag length and containing the writing ARCHIPEL / DES / ILES / AUSTRALES ("Archipelago of the Austral Islands"). The remaining 2/3 is horizontally divided into five bands with the colors yellow, red, white, green and blue.
