= Flag of the Marquesas Islands =

Flag of an archipelago

Marquesas Islands
- Flag of Marquesas Islands, 2017–present
- Proportion: 2:3
- Adopted: 30 November 1998 (last updated in 2017)
- Design: A flag divided in to a top yellow half and a bottom red half with a white triangle in the hoist charged with the design of Maitiki.
- Designed by: Motu Haka Association and Teiki Huukena

The flag of the Marquesas Islands is the flag chosen by the regional government to represent the islands. However, it is not formally recognized by France, the administrative government of the region.

== Description ==
The flag is divided into two horizontal stripes with yellow on top and red on the bottom, with a white equilateral triangle emerging from the hoist. The yellow represents youth and joy, while the red and white are tapu, or sacred, to the chiefs and priests respectively.

In the white triangle, a black design of Matatiki ("the gaze of Tiki") represents the first man in Polynesian mythology, and the inventor of sculpture and tattooing. The tattoo design on Tiki's cheeks are tapu symbols.

== History ==
The flag of the Marquesas Islands with an earlier version of the Matatiki, used until 2017.

The first version of the flag was revealed December 30, 1978 by the Motu Haka Association. The flag was formally adopted by the local government on November 30, 1998. The flag was used informally for many years, having been first raised on December 14, 1980, at the opening of the airport on Nuku Hiva.

The design of Matatiki has appeared in several versions throughout the years. The design was most recently updated in 2017 by Teiki Huukena, a Marquesas Island tattoo artist.

== Other flags of the Marquesas Islands ==
=== Flag of France ===
The flag of France is the only ensign officially recognized by the French government to represent the Marquesas Islands.

=== Flag of French Polynesia ===
The overseas country which Marquesas Islands are a part of also has its own flag. It was adopted by the regional government in 1984.

=== Kingdom of Nuku Hiva Flag ===
On June 1, 1835, French nobleman Baron de Thierry declared himself king of Nuku Hiva, the largest island of the Marquesas. The so-called kingdom was never formalized in any way and Thierry left the island shortly after. A design associated with Thierry's claim has appeared in publications and throughout the internet, but its origin and connection to the historical incident remain unverified.

Flag of France

Flag of French Polynesia

Flag of Kingdom of Nuku Hiva
