= List of symbols of states and territories of Australia =

This is a list of the symbols of the states and territories of Australia. Each state and territory has its own set of official symbols, as well as the national symbols of Australia. For the logos and other corporate symbols used by each state and territory government, see the corresponding government article.

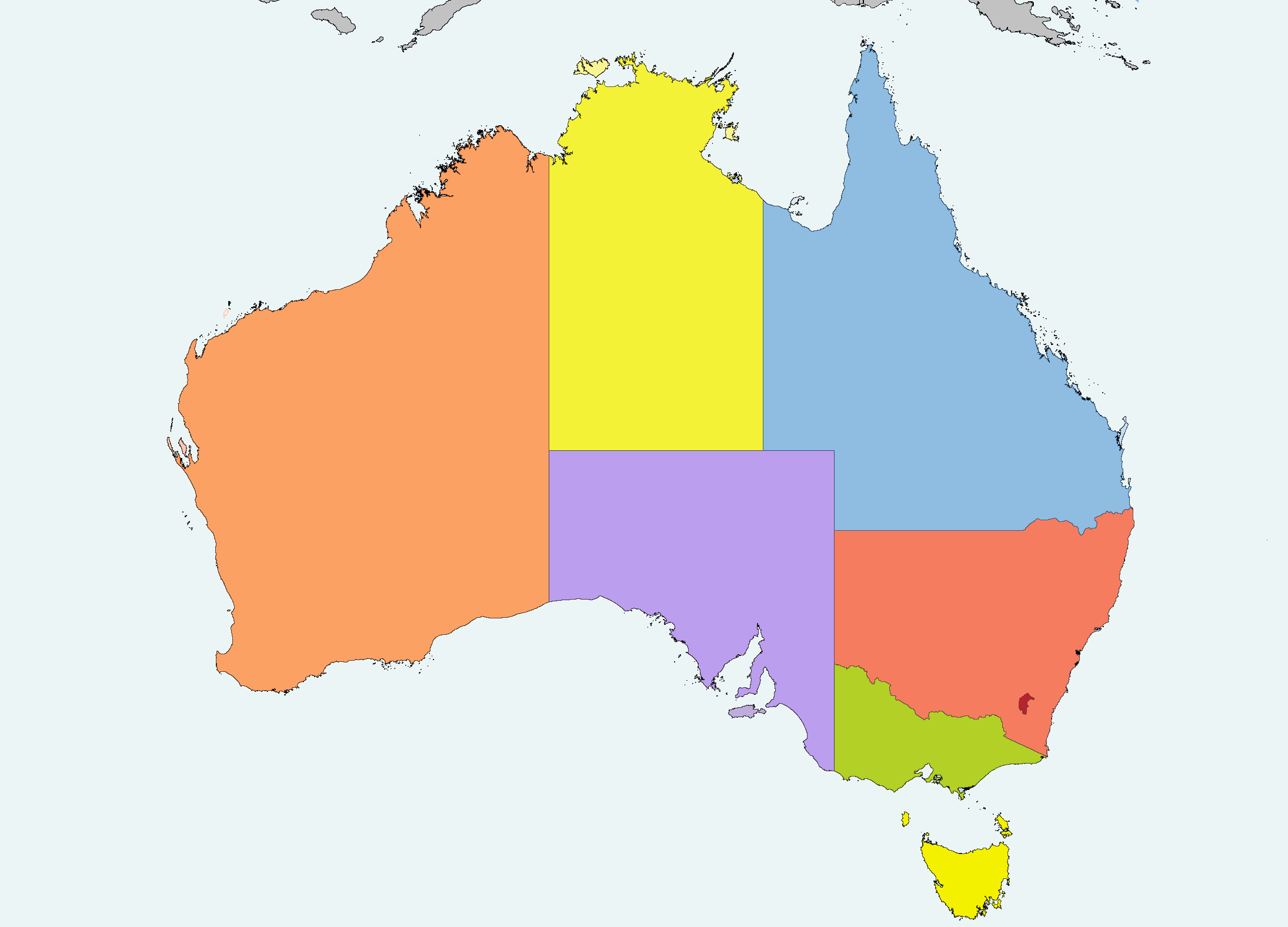

== States ==
State	Coat of arms	Badge	Floral	Avian	Mammal	Marine	Motto	Colours	Geological	Palaeontological	Tartan (Note: All of the state tartans are registered in the Scottish Register of Tartans as district tartans. However, only some of them have been officially adopted, approved or procured by the relevant state. For more information, see District tartans of Australia.)	Main article
New South Wales	Coat of arms of New South Wales		Waratah	Kookaburra	Platypus	Eastern blue groper	Orta recens quam pura nites Newly risen how brightly you shine	Sky blue	Black opal	Mandageria fairfaxi	New South Wales tartan	Symbols of New South Wales
Government	Coat of arms of New South Wales		Waratah	Kookaburra	Platypus	Eastern blue groper	Orta recens quam pura nites Newly risen how brightly you shine	Sky blue	Black opal	Mandageria fairfaxi	New South Wales tartan	Symbols of New South Wales
Queensland	Coat of arms of Queensland		Cooktown orchid	Brolga	Koala	Barrier reef anemone fish	Audax at Fidelis; Bold but Faithful	Maroon	Sapphire	Muttaburrasaurus langdoni	Queensland tartan	Symbols of Queensland
Government	Coat of arms of Queensland		Cooktown orchid	Brolga	Koala	Barrier reef anemone fish	Audax at Fidelis; Bold but Faithful	Maroon	Sapphire	Muttaburrasaurus langdoni	Queensland tartan	Symbols of Queensland
South Australia	Coat of arms of South Australia		Sturt's desert pea	Piping shrike	Hairy-nosed wombat	Leafy seadragon	Faith and Courage (Historical) (Note: There is presently no official motto. The motto listed here is historical and accompanied the coat of arms granted under Edward VIII in 1936.)	Blue, red and gold	Opal (state gemstone) Bornite (state mineral)	Spriggina floundersi	South Australian tartan	Symbols of South Australia
Government	Coat of arms of South Australia		Sturt's desert pea	Piping shrike	Hairy-nosed wombat	Leafy seadragon	Faith and Courage (Historical)	Blue, red and gold	Opal (state gemstone) Bornite (state mineral)	Spriggina floundersi	South Australian tartan	Symbols of South Australia
Tasmania	Coat of arms of Tasmania		Tasmanian blue gum	—	Tasmanian devil	—	Ubertas et fidelitas Fertility and Faithfulness	Bottle green, yellow and maroon	Crocoite	—	Tasmanian tartan	Symbols of Tasmania
Government	Coat of arms of Tasmania		Tasmanian blue gum	—	Tasmanian devil	—	Ubertas et fidelitas Fertility and Faithfulness	Bottle green, yellow and maroon	Crocoite	—	Tasmanian tartan	Symbols of Tasmania
Victoria	Coat of arms of Victoria	Badge of Victoria	Common (pink) heath	Helmeted honeyeater	Leadbeater's possum	Weedy seadragon	Peace and Prosperity	Navy blue and silver	Gold	Koolasuchus cleelandi	Victorian tartan	Symbols of Victoria
Government	Coat of arms of Victoria	Badge of Victoria	Common (pink) heath	Helmeted honeyeater	Leadbeater's possum	Weedy seadragon	Peace and Prosperity	Navy blue and silver	Gold	Koolasuchus cleelandi	Victorian tartan	Symbols of Victoria
Western Australia	Coat of arms of Western Australia		Red and green kangaroo paw	Black swan	Numbat	Whale shark	Cygnis insignis Distinguished for swans (Unofficial) (Note: An unofficial motto referenced in other texts. See Coat of arms of Western Australia.)	Gold and black	—	Gogo fish	Western Australian tartan	Symbols of Western Australia
Government	Coat of arms of Western Australia		Red and green kangaroo paw	Black swan	Numbat	Whale shark	Cygnis insignis Distinguished for swans (Unofficial)	Gold and black	—	Gogo fish	Western Australian tartan	Symbols of Western Australia

== Territories ==
Territory	Coat of arms / emblem	Floral	Avian	Animal	Marine	Motto	Colours	Geological	Palaeontological	Tartan	Main article
Australian Capital Territory	Coat of arms of Canberra (Note: The ACT has no officially granted arms, but as the governments of the territory and city are unified, the city's arms are used as though they were the territory's.)	Royal bluebell	Gang-gang cockatoo	Brush-tailed rock-wallaby	—	For the King, the Law and the People	Blue and gold	—	Batocara mitchelli	City of Canberra tartan (Note: The City of Canberra tartan is registered in the Scottish Register of Tartans as a fashion tartan. It has not been officially adopted by the ACT government, but has that government's support.)	Symbols of the Australian Capital Territory
Government	Coat of arms of Canberra	Royal bluebell	Gang-gang cockatoo	Brush-tailed rock-wallaby	—	For the King, the Law and the People	Blue and gold	—	Batocara mitchelli	City of Canberra tartan	Symbols of the Australian Capital Territory
Northern Territory	Coat of arms of the Northern Territory	Sturt's desert rose	Wedge-tailed eagle	Red kangaroo	Barramundi	—	Black, white and red ochre	—	—	—	Symbols of the Northern Territory
Government	Coat of arms of the Northern Territory	Sturt's desert rose	Wedge-tailed eagle	Red kangaroo	Barramundi	—	Black, white and red ochre	—	—	—	Symbols of the Northern Territory
Norfolk Island	Coat of arms of Norfolk Island	Phillip Island hibiscus	Norfolk Island green parrot	—	—	Inasmuch	Green and sky blue	—	—	—	Symbols of Norfolk Island
Government	Coat of arms of Norfolk Island	Phillip Island hibiscus	Norfolk Island green parrot	—	—	Inasmuch	Green and sky blue	—	—	—	Symbols of Norfolk Island
Christmas Island (Unofficial) (Note: The flag is widely used in the territory, but has not been proclaimed as a flag of Australia under the Flags Act 1953.)	Emblem of Christmas Island (Unofficial) (Note: This emblem has no official status. It derives from the letterhead of the Phosphate Mining Company of Christmas Island (PMCI), which formerly operated the island's phosphate mine. It depicts the Southern Cross with the Commonwealth Star, the waves of the sea, and stylised hands holding a tree.)	—	Golden bosun bird (Note: The golden bosun bird (Phaethon lepturus ssp. fulvus, a subspecies of the white-tailed tropicbird) features on the flag of the territory, but has not been gazetted as an official emblem.)	Christmas Island red crab (Note: Gecarcoidea natalis. The annual red crab migration is a unique feature of the island and is widely treated as a de facto symbol, but has not been gazetted.)	—	—	—	—	—	—	Symbols of Christmas Island
Government	Emblem of Christmas Island (Unofficial)	—	Golden bosun bird	Christmas Island red crab	—	—	—	—	—	—	Symbols of Christmas Island
Cocos (Keeling) Islands (Unofficial) (Note: The flag is widely used in the territory, but has not been proclaimed as a flag of Australia under the Flags Act 1953.)	Seal of the Cocos (Keeling) Islands (Unofficial) (Note: The Clunies-Ross family were the islands' former proprietors and administrators. Their coat of arms is sometimes described as the seal of the territory, but it is not a grant to the territory and has no official status.)	Coconut palm (Note: Cocos nucifera. The coconut palm features on the flag and on the shire logo; it is widely treated as the territory's floral emblem, but has not been gazetted.)	—	—	—	Maju Pulau Kita; Advance our islands (Note: Maju Pulau Kita is in Cocos Malay and is used as the motto of the Shire of Cocos (Keeling) Islands.)	—	—	—	—	Symbols of the Cocos (Keeling) Islands
Government	Seal of the Cocos (Keeling) Islands (Unofficial)	Coconut palm	—	—	—	Maju Pulau Kita; Advance our islands	—	—	—	—	Symbols of the Cocos (Keeling) Islands

== See also ==
- Australian state colours
- National colours of Australia
- National symbols of Australia
- List of Australian bird emblems
- List of Australian mammal emblems
- States and territories of Australia
