= Symbols of Tasmania =

Tasmania is one of Australia's states, and has established several state symbols and emblems.

== Official symbols ==
Symbol	Name	Image	Adopted	Remarks
State Flag	Flag of Tasmania	Flag of Tasmania	3 December 1975	It was approved by the British Colonial Office on 29 November 1875
State Badge	State Badge of Tasmania	State Badge of Tasmania	29 November 1875	
State Coat of arms	Coat of arms of Tasmania	Coat of Arms of Tasmania	7 March 1919	The Coat of arms of Tasmania is an official symbol of the state, granted by King George V on 29 May 1917. The shield features significant representations of Tasmanian industry, including a sheaf of wheat, hops, a ram, and Tasmanian apples on a branch.
State Motto	Ubertas et fidelitas Fertility and Faithfulness		7 March 1919	Granted with other elements of the coat of arms
State Flower Emblem	Tasmanian blue gum Eucalyptus globulus	Tasmanian blue gum	5 December 1962	
State Animal Emblem	Tasmanian devil Sarcophilus harrisii	Tasmanian Devil	22 May 2015	
State Mineral Emblem	Crocoite	Crocoite	6 December 2000	
State tartan	Tasmanian tartan	Tasmanian tartan	1999	Recorded prior to the launch of the Scottish Register of Tartans (SRT) in 2009, and also registered in the SRT as a district tartan. Although it is not included in the lists of State emblems and symbols published by the legislative and executive arms of the government of Tasmania, its entry in the SRT, and the corresponding web page of the Scottish Tartans Authority website, both assert that it was recognised in 1999 as the official State tartan.
State government logo	Tasmanian Government Logo			

== See also ==
- Australian state colours
- List of symbols of states and territories of Australia
- Tasmanian apples as a state symbol
