= Symbols of the Australian Capital Territory =

The Australian Capital Territory is one of Australia's territories, and has established several territorial symbols and emblems.

== Official symbols ==
Symbol	Name	Image	Adopted	Remarks
Territorial Flag	Flag of the Australian Capital Territory		1993	One third blue with the Southern Cross, the other two thirds are yellow with the coat of arms of Canberra.
Territorial Coat of arms	Coat of Arms of the Australian Capital Territory	Coat of Arms of the Australian Capital Territory	7 November 1928	Granted by King George V to the City of Canberra. The Australian Capital Territory is the only Australian jurisdiction without a coat of arms.
Territorial Motto	PRO REGE LEGE ET GREGE		7 November 1928	Illustrated with other elements of the coat of arms granted to the City of Canberra, meaning "For the King, the Law, and the People."
Territorial Floral Emblem	Royal bluebell Wahlenbergia gloriosa	Royal bluebell	26 May 1982	
Territorial Bird Emblem	Gang-gang cockatoo Callocephalon fimbriatum	Gang-gang cockatoo	27 February 1997	
Territorial Colours	Blue and Gold			
Territorial fossil Emblem	Batocara mitchelli			
Territorial tartan	City of Canberra tartan	City of Canberra tartan	-	The City of Canberra tartan was recorded in 1997, and has since been registered in the Scottish Register of Tartans (SRT). Technically, the tartan is registered as a fashion tartan, not a district tartan. It has also not been formally adopted as an official emblem either of the city, or of the ACT. However, the tartan is supported by the ACT government and is worn by Canberra's official town crier.
Territorial government logo	Government of the Australian Capital Territory Logo			

== See also ==
- List of symbols of states and territories of Australia
- Australian state colours
