= Symbols of Western Australia =

Western Australia is one of the states of Australia, and has established several state symbols and emblems.

== Official symbols ==
Symbol	Name	Image	Adopted	Remarks
State flag	Flag of Western Australia	Flag of Western Australia	1870	The swan faced was changed in 1953 to look towards the Union Jack in accordance with heraldic principles.
State badge	State badge of Western Australia	State Badge of Western Australia	27 November 1875	The state badge was approved by the Colonial Office 1875.
State coat of arms	Coat of arms of Western Australia	Coat of arms of Western Australia	17 March 1969	The coat of arms was granted by Queen Elizabeth II by royal warrant.
State governor flag	Personal flag of the governor of Western Australia	Personal flag of the governor of Western Australia	12 April 1988	
State floral emblem	Red and green kangaroo paw Anigozanthos manglesii	Red and green kangaroo paw	9 November 1960	
State bird emblem	Black swan Cygnus atratus	Black swan	25 July 1973	
State animal emblem	Numbat; Myrmecobius fasciatus	Numbat	25 July 1973	
State fossil emblem	Gogo fish Mcnamaraspis kaprios		5 December 1995	
State marine animal emblem	Whale shark Rhincodon typus	Whale shark	12 November 2013	
State tartan	Western Australia (Scottish Associations) tartan	Western Australia (Scottish Associations) tartan	—	Endorsed by the then Member for Albany in the Western Australian Legislative Assembly, and registered in the Scottish Register of Tartans (SRT) as a district tartan on 22 November 2011. Earlier, on 23 May 2011, it had been recorded in the database of the Scottish Tartans Authority. The Caledonian Society of Albany have petitioned the Premier of Western Australia to have the tartan proclaimed as the Western Australia tartan. However, it has not been officially adopted by the government of Western Australia.
State government logo	Government of Western Australia Logo			

== See also ==
- List of symbols of states and territories of Australia
- Australian state colours
