= Symbols of South Australia =

South Australia is one of Australia's states, and has established several state symbols and emblems.

== Official symbols ==
Symbol	Name	Image	Adopted	Remarks
State flag	Flag of South Australia	Flag of South Australia	13 January 1904	
State badge	State badge of South Australia	State Badge of South Australia	14 January 1904	The State Badge consists of a "piping shrike" (also known as an Australian magpie) standing on a gum branch with its back to us, its head turned to its left, and facing towards the rising sun, represented by a golden disc. The specific sub-species of Australian magpie is the white backed magpie (Gymnorhina tibicen telonocua)
State coat of arms	Coat of arms of South Australia	Coat of arms of South Australia	19 April 1984	Granted by Queen Elizabeth II, The present coat of arms replaced the arms granted by King Edward VIII in 1936.
Colours	Blue, red and gold		25 November 1982	Blue-Pantone 295, Red-Pantone 199 & Gold-Pantone 137
State floral emblem	Sturt's desert pea Swainsona formosa	Sturt's Desert Pea	23 November 1961	
State faunal emblem	Hairy nosed wombat Lasiorhinus latifrons	Hairy Nosed Wombat	27 August 1970	
State gemstone emblem	Opal	Opal	5 August 1985	
State Mineral emblem	Bornite	Bornite	28 June 2017	
State marine emblem	Leafy seadragon Phycodurus eques	Leafy Seadragon	8 February 2001	
State fossil emblem	Spriggina floundersi	Spriggina	14 February 2017	
State tartan	South Australia Official tartan	South Australia Official tartan	18 February 2018	Officially accepted by the "Scottish Association" in 2008 as the State tartan. Recorded the same year (STA ref: 7956; STWR ref: 3281), and subsequently registered in the Scottish Register of Tartans as a district tartan under the name South Australia Official tartan (SRT ref: 5990). On 18 February 2018, the then Premier of South Australia, Jay Weatherill, announced that the South Australia Official tartan had "... officially been adopted for the State of South Australia."
State government logo	Government of South Australia Logo			

== See also ==
- List of symbols of states and territories of Australia
- Australian state colours
