= Symbols of Queensland =

Symbols and emblems that represent the state of Queensland, Australia

The symbols of Queensland represent the Australian state of Queensland and the Queensland Government. The different symbols and emblems represent both the state (the Commonwealth monarch, represented by the State Governor) and the government (the Premier and Governor-in-Council). The official state emblems of Queensland are prescribed in the Emblems of Queensland Act 2005.

== State flag of Queensland ==

The state flag of Queensland is a British Blue Ensign with the state badge on a white disc added in the fly. The badge is a light blue Maltese Cross with an imperial crown in the centre of the cross. The flag dates from 1876, with minor variations, and the badge was designed by William Hemmant, the Colonial Secretary and Treasurer of Queensland in 1876.

== Queensland Badge ==

The current State Badge was approved on 29 November 1876 by the Governor of Queensland. The badge is officially described as “On a Roundel Argent a Maltese Cross Azure surmounted with a Royal Crown”.

== Coat of arms of Queensland ==

Queen Victoria granted the Queensland coat of arms to the Colony of Queensland in 1893, making it the oldest state arms in Australia. It depicts Queensland's primary industries in the 19th century with a sheaf of wheat, the heads of a bull and a ram, and a column of gold rising from a heap of quartz. Two stalks of sugar cane which surround the state badge at the top, and below is Queensland's state motto, Audax at Fidelis, which means "Bold but Faithful". In 1977, Queen Elizabeth II granted the supporting animals, the brolga and the red deer.

== Queensland Government crest ==
Since August 2012, the Queensland coat of arms has been used as the state government's corporate logo.

== Queensland state motto and colour ==
=== Motto ===
"Audax at Fidelis" (Bold but Faithful)

=== Colour ===
In November 2003, maroon was officially named as Queensland's state colour, after many years of association with Queensland sporting teams (most notably the Queensland Maroons and the Brisbane Broncos).

== Emblems ==
=== Aquatic emblem ===
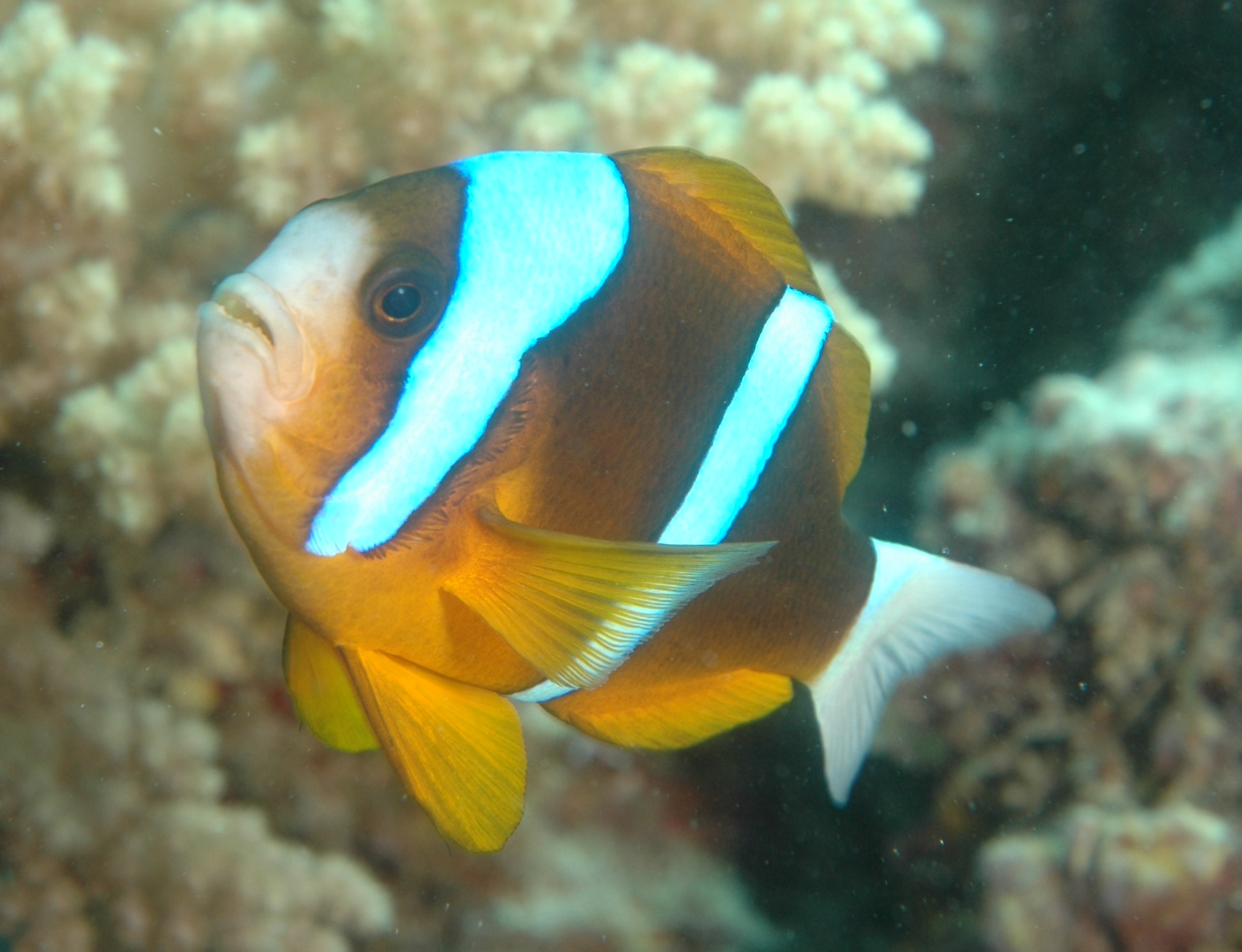
Barrier reef anemonefish (Amphiprion akindynos)

The Barrier Reef anemone fish was officially named as Queensland's aquatic emblem in March 2005.

=== Animal emblem ===
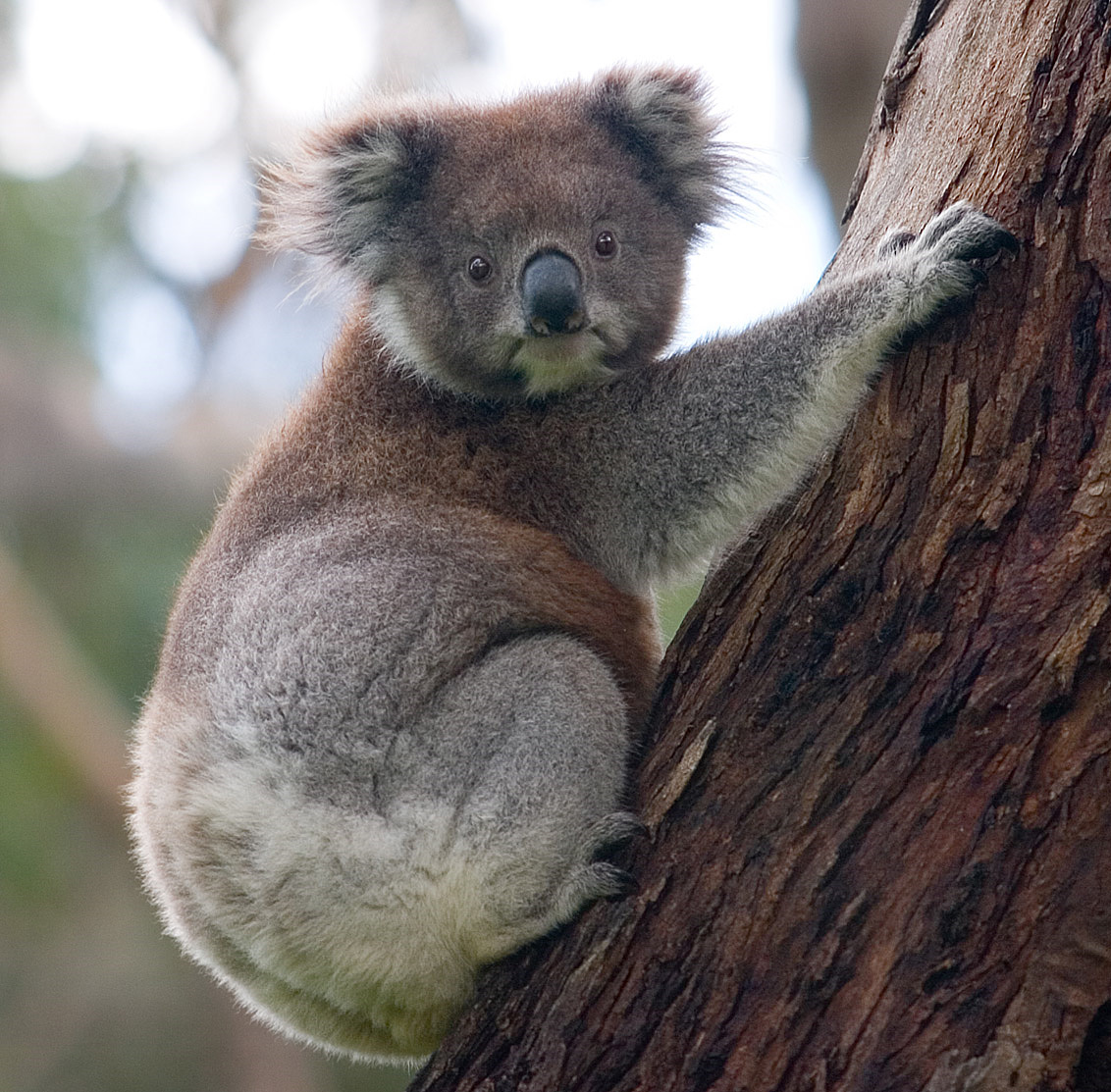
Koala (Phascolarctos cinereus)

The koala was officially named the animal or faunal, emblem of Queensland in 1971, after a newspaper poll showed strong public support. The Queensland Government introduced the poll due to a proposal by state tourism ministers for all states to adopt a faunal emblem.

=== Bird emblem ===
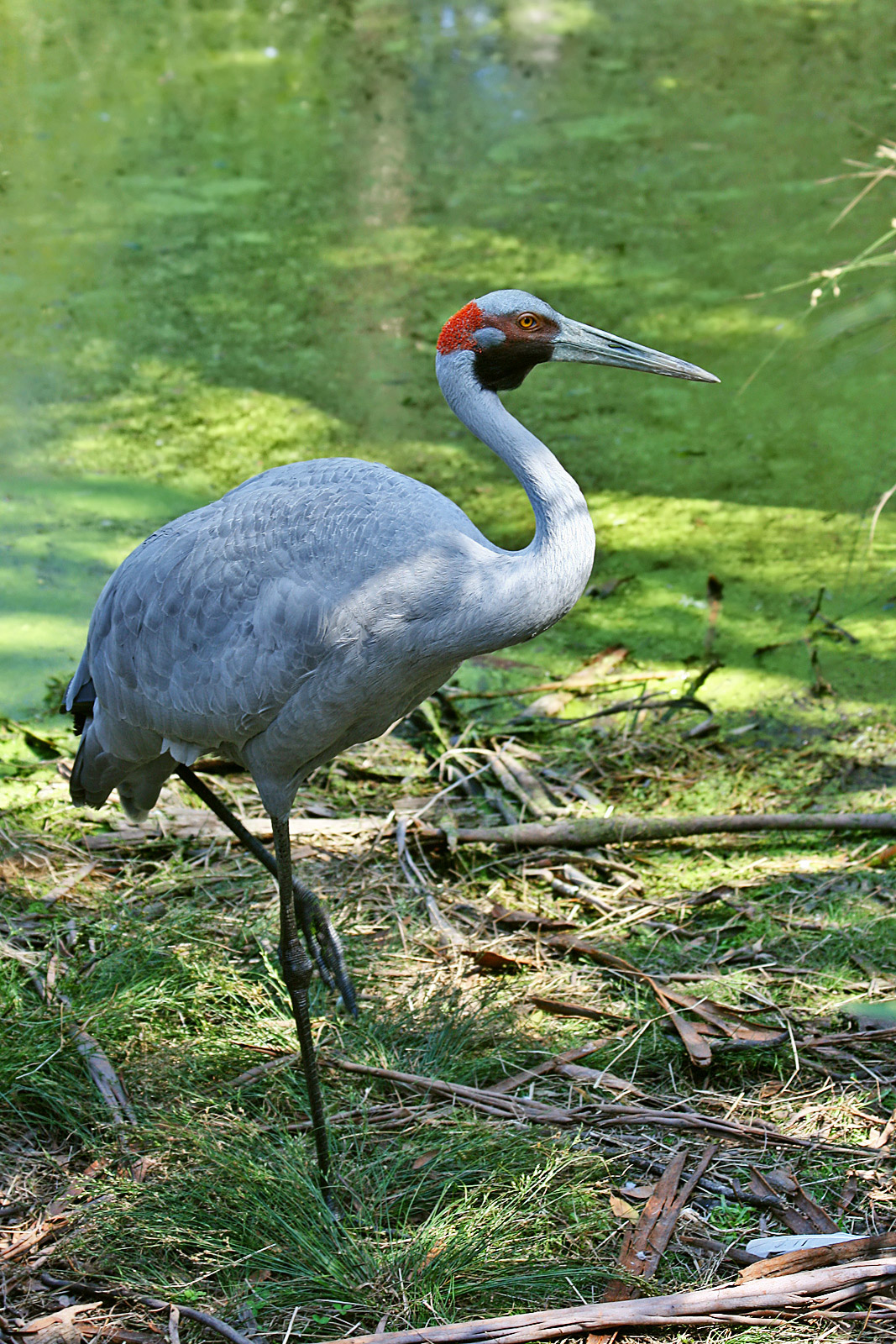
Brolga (Grus rubicunda)

In January 1986 the brolga was announced as the official bird emblem of Queensland, after being on the coat of arms since 1977.

=== Floral emblem ===
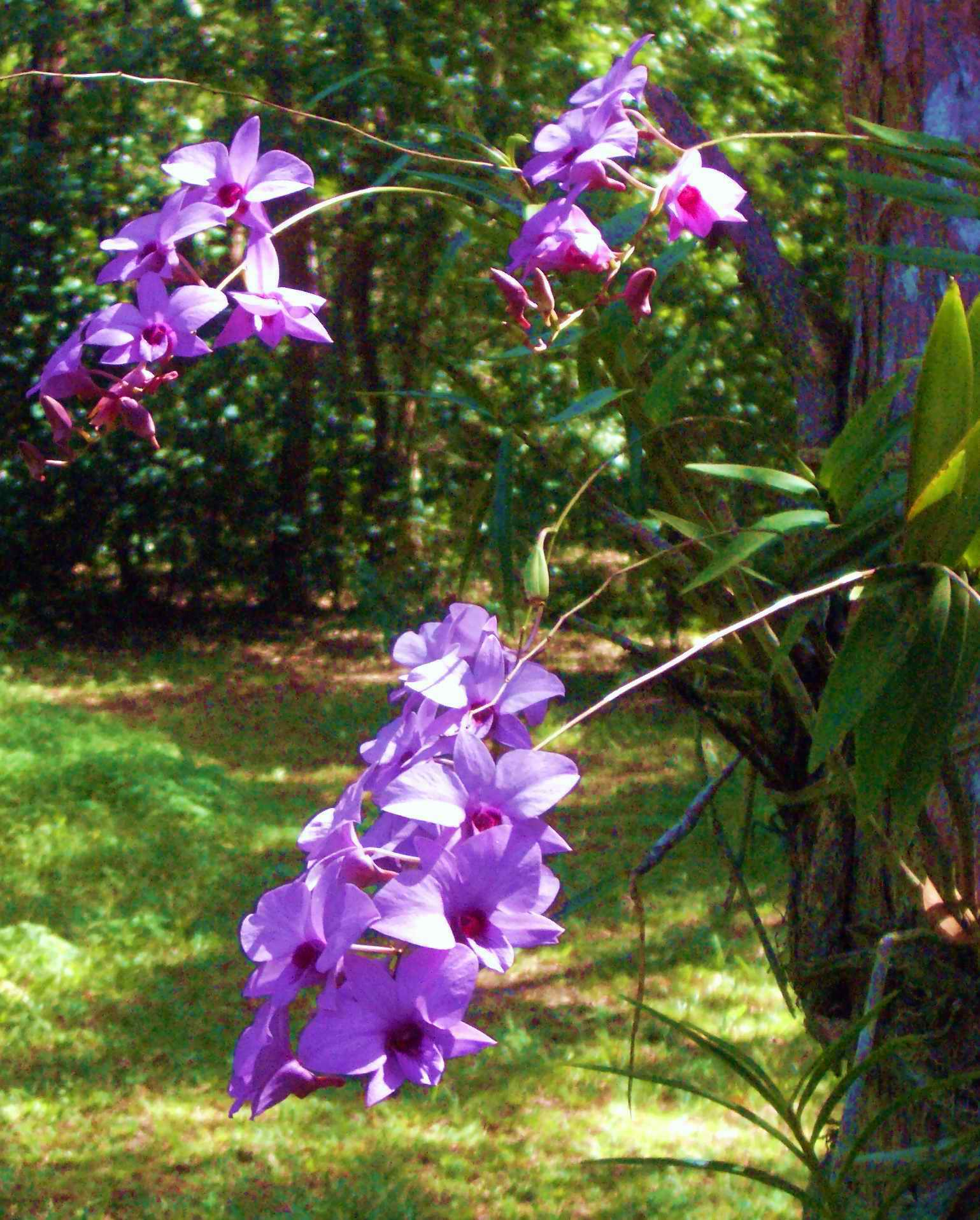
Cooktown orchid (Dendrobium phalaenopsis)

The Cooktown orchid became known as Queensland's floral emblem in 1959, during celebrations to mark the state's centenary. In 1968 the Cooktown orchid was featured on an Australian postage stamp.

=== Fossil emblem ===
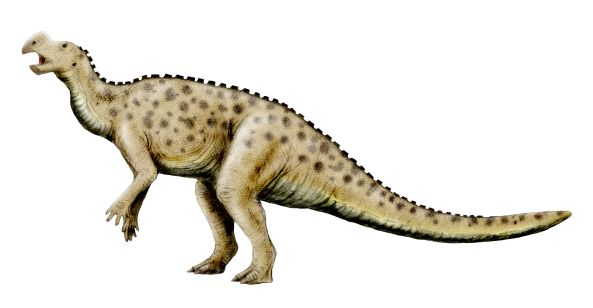
Muttaburrasaurus

Following a campaign from a group of twelve candidates, the Muttaburrasaurus langdoni big-nosed dinosaur became the state's first fossil emblem in October 2022.

=== Gemstone emblem ===
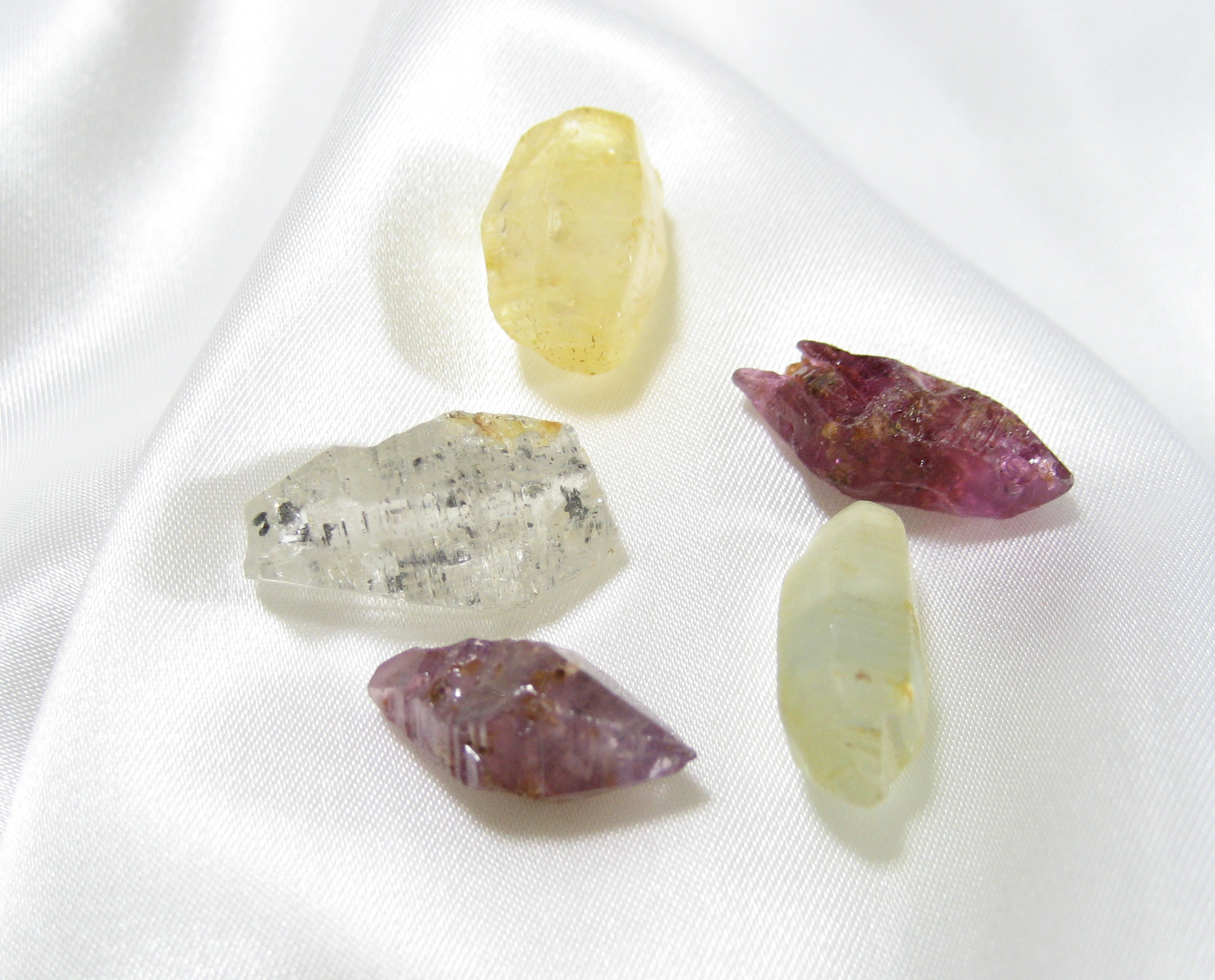
Sapphire

The sapphire, of any colour, is the state's gem emblem.

=== State tartan ===
Queensland tartan

Designed by Jack Allen using seven basic colours to depict the State of Queensland. Colours: white represents the small amount of cloud in the winter time; azure represents the clear blue winter sky; royal blue represents the Coral Sea, blue in Hervey Bay, Whitsunday Passage and Hinchinbrook; yellow represents the tropical beaches of Queensland, sun and sand; green represents the mountain forests, hardwood forests, pine forests, the grazing fields and farms; lilac represents the flowers of the sugar cane; crimson represents the state's floral emblem, the Cooktown orchid. The then Premier of Queensland, Peter Beattie, "officially approved" the tartan in May 2000, and the registration notes in its entry in the Scottish Register of Tartans (SRT) as a district tartan declare that the then Governor of Queensland recorded its threadcount in the Lyon Court Books (writs section) on 6 February 2001.

== See also ==
- List of symbols of states and territories of Australia
- Australian state colours
