= Symbols of Victoria (state) =

Victoria is one of Australia's states, and has established several state symbols and emblems.

== Official symbols ==
Symbol	Name	Image	Adopted	Remarks
State Flag	Flag of Victoria	Flag of Victoria	12 November 1877	
State Badge	State Badge of Victoria	State Badge of Victoria	4 February 1870	
State Coat of arms	Coat of arms of Victoria	Coat of arms of Victoria	6 June 1910	Granted by King George V
State Motto	Peace and Prosperity		6 June 1910	Granted with other elements of the coat of arms
State Floral Emblem	Common (pink) heath Epacris impresa	Common (pink) heath	11 November 1958	
State Bird Emblem	Helmeted honeyeater Lichenostomus melanops cassidix	Helmeted honeyeater	10 March 1971	
State Animal Emblem	Leadbeater's possum Gymnobelideus leadbeateri	Leadbeater's possum	2 March 1971	
State Marine Emblem	Common seadragon Phyllopteryx taeniolatus	Weedy seadragon	31 October 2002	
State Tartan	Victorian state tartan	Victorian state tartan	June 2008	Recorded in November 1998, and subsequently registered in the Scottish Register of Tartans (SRT) as a district tartan. In 2005, the State of Victoria acquired its copyright, and in June 2008 the then Premier of Victoria, John Brumby, announced that it had been adopted as the Victorian state tartan.
State Mineral Emblem	Gold	Gold	6 September 2012	
State Fossil Emblem	Koolasuchus Cleelandi	Koolasuchus Cleelandi	13 January 2022	
State colour	Navy Blue			Navy blue Pantone 541
State Government Logo	Victoria State Government logo	Victorian State Government logo	August 2015	
State Soil	Mottled Brown Sodosol		2005	Derived from a shortlist of 11 soils nominated by the Australian Society of Soil Science Inc Victorian Branch Committee.

== See also ==
- List of symbols of states and territories of Australia
- Australian state colours
