= Symbols of New South Wales =

New South Wales is one of Australia's states, and has established several state symbols and emblems.

== Official symbols ==
Symbol	Name	Image	Adopted	Remarks
State flag	Flag of New South Wales	Flag of New South Wales	15 February 1876	
State badge	State badge of New South Wales	State Badge of New South Wales	15 February 1876	
State coat of arms	Coat of arms of New South Wales	Coat of Arms of New South Wales	October 1906	Granted by King Edward VII
State motto	Orta recens quam pura nites Newly risen how brightly you shine		October 1906	Granted with other elements of the coat of arms
State floral emblem	WaratahTelopea speciosissima	Waratah	1962	
State bird emblem	Kookaburra; Dacelo Gigas	Kookaburra	1971	
State animal emblem	Platypus; Ornithorhynchus anatinus	Platypus	1971	
State fish emblem	Eastern blue groper Achoerodus viridis	Blue Groper	1998	
State gemstone emblem	Black opal		2008	
State fossil emblem	Mandageria fairfaxir		2015	
State colour	Sky blue			Sky blue Pantone 291
State tartan	New South Wales tartan	Kookaburra		Launched on 4 May 2000 as the state tartan. Recorded prior to the commencement of the Scottish Register of Tartans (SRT) in 2009, and also registered in the SRT as a district tartan. However, it is not officially adopted by the government of New South Wales.
State government logo	Government of New South Wales logo		2009	

== See also ==
- List of symbols of states and territories of Australia
- Australian state colours
