= National symbols of Australia =

Official symbols used to represent Australia

National symbols of Australia are the official symbols used to represent Australia as a nation or the Commonwealth Government. Additionally, each state and territory has its own set of symbols.

Informal national symbols have also played an integral part in the cultural development of Australia. These include natural and invented artefacts associated with Australia, as well as things seen to represent or personify shared ideals, attitudes or concepts such as egalitarianism. For example, the Commonwealth Star evokes the Federation of Australia.

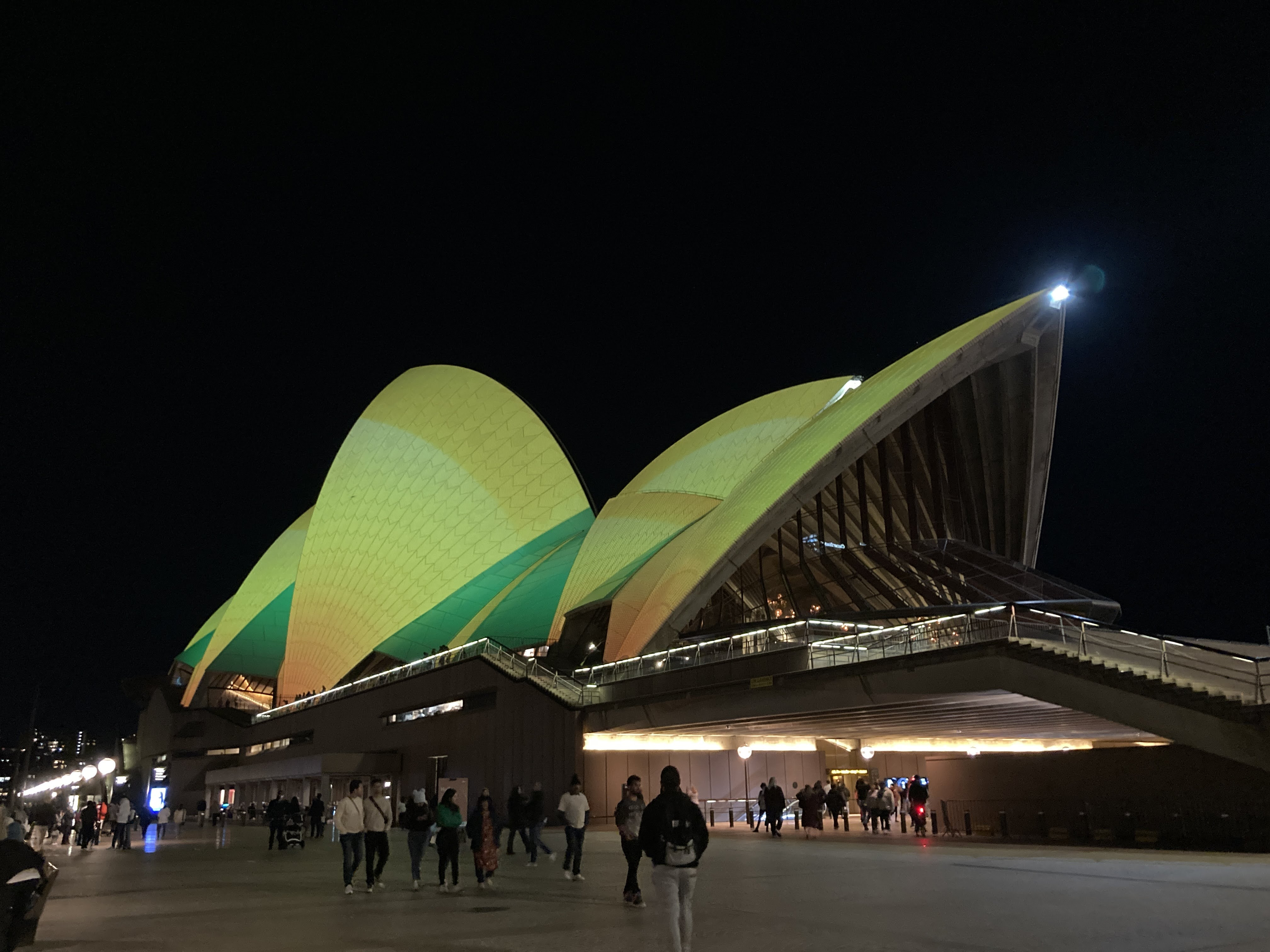
The Sydney Opera House, a national symbol, lit up in green and gold, the national colours, in 2023.

== List of symbols ==
Symbol	Name	Image	Declared	References
National flag	Flag of Australia	Flag of Australia	3 September 1901 (Note: The current version of the flag is from 1908 and was made official with the Flags Act 1953.)	
National coat of arms	Coat of arms of Australia	Commonwealth Coat of Arms	19 September 1912	
Royal Standard Australia	King's Flag for Australia	Flag of Australia	30 August 2024	
Vice-regal standard	Flag of the Governor-General of Australia	Flag of the governor-general of Australia	1 July 2024	
Indigenous flag	Australian Aboriginal flag	Australian Aboriginal Flag	14 July 1995	
Indigenous flag	Torres Strait Islander flag		14 July 1995	
National anthem	"Advance Australia Fair"	"Advance Australia Fair"	19 April 1984	
Royal anthem	"God Save the King"	"God Save the King"	19 April 1984	
National colours	Green and gold		19 April 1984	
National floral emblem	Golden wattle (Acacia pycnantha)	Golden wattle	19 August 1988	
National gemstone	Opal	Opal	27 July 1993	

== See also ==
- District tartans of Australia
- List of Australian flags
