= Symbols of the Northern Territory =

The Northern Territory is one of the Australia's territories, and has established several territorial symbols and emblems.

== Official symbols ==
Symbol	Name	Image	Adopted
Territorial Flag	Flag of the Northern Territory	Flag of the Northern Territory	1 July 1978
Territorial Coat of arms	Coat of arms of the Northern Territory	Coat of arms of the Northern Territory	1 July 1978
Territorial Animal Emblem	Red kangaroo Macropus rufus	Red kangaroo	1975
Territorial Bird Emblem	Wedge-tailed eagle Aquila audax	Wedge tailed eagle	1 July 1978
Territorial Floral Emblem	Sturt's desert rose Gossypium sturtianum	Stuart's desert rose	1974
Territorial Colours	Black, White and Ochre		
Territorial Government Logo	Northern Territory Government Logo		

== See also ==
- List of symbols of states and territories of Australia
- Australian state colours
