= Water polo in New South Wales =

Sport in an Australian state

Water polo is an international game, contested by over 120 countries, and with artistic swimming are the only Olympic team sports played in water. First introduced to the Olympic program at the 1900 Paris Games, water polo and rowing remain the only team sports to be continually programmed for every edition of the Summer Olympics.

== History ==
The sport was introduced to Australia in 1879 by Professor Fred Cavill. By 1880, water polo was being played in New South Wales (NSW) by members of various Sydney swimming clubs, establishing the state as the first region outside Great Britain to adopt the sport. The governing body for the sport in New South Wales began in 1892 under the NSW Amateur Swimming Association (NSWASA), which in 1929 devolved to the NSW Amateur Water Polo Association (NSWAWPA). Today, water polo thrives across all Australian states, and is played by men, women, and juniors in schools, clubs, and community competitions.

== Governance ==
The state's governing body is now called Water Polo New South Wales, and is headquartered at Sydney Olympic Park. The organization administers and promotes water polo across metropolitan and regional NSW, manages competitions, and fosters development programs for players.

New South Wales has played a pivotal role in the development of water polo in Australia, serving as a model for establishing the sport in other states and internationally. The state has also been instrumental in producing elite players and fostering a rich competitive culture.

Its premier competition, the Sydney Super League (SSL), formerly known as the Metropolitan Water Polo Premiership and the Rawson Cup, is recognized as one of the oldest annual sports competitions globally, with a history spanning over 130 years.

== Representative teams ==
New South Wales is renowned for developing many of Australia’s finest water polo athletes and has historically dominated the national water polo championships, producing more national representatives than any other state. Six of the ten players in Australia’s first Olympic water polo team at the 1948 London Olympics were from NSW, while six players in Australia’s first women’s Olympic water polo team, and gold medallists at the 2000 Sydney Olympics, were also from NSW.

=== Colours and badge ===
The official colours of Water Polo New South Wales are sky blue and dark blue, representing the traditional state colours of the New South Wales.

== National championships ==
New South Wales men’s teams competed in intercolonial and interstate tournaments from 1894 to 1995, while the women’s teams participated from 1967 to 2002. The NSWAWPA helped initiate and host several key events, including:

- The Regal Cup two-way series against Victoria beginning in 1925.
- The inaugural men’s Australian Water Polo Championship, first held at North Sydney Olympic Pool in 1948.

New South Wales teams won both inaugural editions of these tournaments’ and have captured a record 43 Australian Championship titles. Since 2002, the Open National Championships have been placed on hold by the introduction of the Australian Water Polo League. However, NSW continues to field strong junior, age-group and club teams, preserving its legacy by claiming 12 of 22 national championships in season 2023/24.

The state has also competed in international test matches against teams from countries such as New Zealand, New Caledonia, and Czechoslovakia, further establishing itself as a key contributor to the sport.

== See also ==
- Australian Water Polo League
- Water polo in Australia
