= Flag of Tasmania =

Tasmania
- Use: Civil and state flag
- Proportion: 1:2
- Adopted: 25 September 1876; 150 years ago
- Design: A state badge of a red lion passant on white disk, on a defaced British Blue Ensign.

The current state flag of Tasmania was officially adopted following a proclamation by Tasmanian colonial Governor Sir Frederick Weld on 25 September 1876, and was first published in the Tasmanian Gazette the same day. The governor's proclamation here were three official flags, they being the Governor's flag, the Tasmania Government vessel flag, and a Tasmania merchant flag. Up until 1856 when Tasmania was granted responsible self-government, the Union Flag and the British ensign were primarily used on state occasions.

The flag consists of a defaced British Blue Ensign with the state badge located in the fly. The badge is a white disk with a red lion passant in the centre of the disk. There is no official record of how the lion came to be included on the flag, but it is assumed that the red lion is a reference to Great Britain. This flag has remained almost unchanged since 1875, with only a slight change of the style of the lion when the flag was officially adopted by the government in 1975, although this was a mistake, as it had already been officially gazetted by the colonial government in 1876.

== History ==
Following the establishment of permanent British sovereign possession of the lands of Tasmania, Tasmania was granted responsible self-government in 1856. However, the colony did not receive its own flag until Queen Victoria had first proposed on 7 August 1869, that the colony of Tasmania (and the other Australian colonies) should adopt a Union Flag defaced in the centre with the State Badge. Prior to the official adoption of a local flag, an unofficial merchant ensign was occasionally used:

Ensign of Van Diemen's Land

The first local flag of Tasmania was adopted by proclamation of Tasmanian colonial Governor Sir Frederick Weld on 9 November 1875. The flag had a white cross on a blue field, in the canton was the Union Flag, and in the fly was five five-pointed stars of the Southern Cross. The British Blue Ensign and Red Ensign (for use respectively by government vessels and by those privately owned) were to have a white cross added. At the fly end of each flag, a Southern Cross was to be formed of white stars added above and below the horizontal arm of the cross. Two weeks later, on 23 November, those flags were officially abandoned because Henry Herbert, 4th Earl of Carnarvon, the Secretary of State for the Colonies in London made it clear that only a single badge could be placed at the fly end of the ensign, as set out by rule of the British Admiralty.

Flag used in November 1875

A year later the Tasmanian government decided, with the British Admiralty's approval, that the badge for the colony would be a red lion on a white disk. Originally the lion was to be gold in colour, above a golden torse, which the new flag omitted in favour of a more traditional red.

A British Blue Ensign with the badge served Tasmanian government vessels, and privately owned vessels were to fly an un-defaced British Red Ensign. After Tasmania became a state within the Commonwealth of Australia on 1 January 1901, the Tasmanian Blue Ensign was rarely used and was reserved for official purposes. Most vessels soon preferred to fly the Australian Red Ensign.

On 3 December 1975, a government proclamation by Governor Sir Stanley Burbury, and endorsed by Premier Bill Neilson established it as the official Tasmanian flag, although it had technically already been 'officially' adopted when it was gazetted in 1876. Since that time it has been acceptable for private citizens to use the flag, although it is uncommon to see them doing so.

== Proposed changes ==
It has been suggested that the Tasmanian state flag is not representative of the island, and should be changed to something more suitable.

An amateur proposal for replacing the State Flag of Tasmania. It features a prominent floral emblem and important monofloral honey species, leatherwood (Eucryphia lucida).

The impetus to change the state flag is a part of the broader push to change the national flag of Australia.

On 8 June 2020, online news website Tasmanian Times launched a public competition calling for designs to replace the existing flag.

== Devices ==
The flag of Tasmania has two distinct symbols, the Union Flag (also known as the Union Jack), and the State Badge of Tasmania.

As with the flag of Australia, the Union Flag is thought locally to symbolise Australia's history as six British colonies and the principles upon which the Australian Federation is based, Australian Flag Society although a more historic view sees its inclusion in the design as demonstrating loyalty to the British Empire.

== Construction ==
Unlike the national flag, the flag of Tasmania is not enshrined and protected by any acts of state or Commonwealth government. As a result, there are no official legal requirements for the construction of the flag of Tasmania. However, tradition and decorum dictate that is should be:

1. the Union Jack occupying the upper quarter next the staff;
2. the fly is to be wholly blue, in line with the British Blue Ensign;
3. the State Badge is to be situated with its centre halfway between the edge of the canton and the end of the fly, and a third of the distance from the bottom of the flag;
State badge of Tasmania

== Colours ==
The colours of the flag, although not specified by the Flags Act, have been given the same Pantone specifications as the national flag. The Australian Government's Style Manual for Authors, Editors and Printers also gives CMYK and RGB specifications for depicting the flag in print and on screen respectively.

Scheme	Blue	Red	White
Pantone	280 C	185 C	Safe
RGB (Hex)	0-0-139 (#00008B)	255-0-0 (#FF0000)	255-255-255 (#FFFFFF)
CMYK	100%-80%-0%-0%	0%-100%-100%-0%	0%-0%-0%-0%

== Governor's flag ==
The Governor of Tasmania, being the representative of the Tasmanian head of state, the King of Australia, is officially granted a flag for use on all official occasions. It is identical in design and construction to the flag of Tasmania, except that it features a St. Edward's Crown above the badge to represent vice-regal power.

When the Governor of Tasmania is resident at Government House it is flown from the roof, and it is also used as a car flag. The Governor of Tasmania's flag was officially adopted in February 1977 by an act of the Parliament of Tasmania.

Standard of the governor, 9–23 November 1875

Standard of the governor, 1876–1977

== See also ==
- Coat of arms of Tasmania
- List of Australian flags
- Flags of the governors of the Australian states
