= Water polo in Australia =

- Country: Australia
- Governing body: Water Polo Australia
- National team(s): Australia

National competitions
- Australian National Water Polo League

International competitions
- Water polo at the World Aquatics Championships; FINA Water Polo World League; Holiday Cup; World Club Water Polo Challenge; Water Polo by the Sea; Tom Hoad Cup

Water polo in Australia is governed by Water Polo Australia and its state based Water polo associations.

== History ==
Although the game was first launched in Great Britain in the 1860s, Australia was the second nation in the world to adopt and begin playing the sport of water polo. The first match known to have occurred in Australia was held at Hegarty's Railway Baths at St Kilda, Melbourne on 1 March 1879, as demonstrated by Professor Fred Cavill. The first domestic league in the country commenced with the Sydney Metropolitan premiership in 1892. New South Wales played a pivotal role in the development of water polo in Australia.

== Competitions ==
The forerunner of the current national Water polo championship was the Australian Water Polo Club Championship, which was contested annually from 1975 until 1990 for men, and from 1984 until 2003 for women.

Today, the Australian Water Polo League (AWL) is Australia’s premier domestic water polo competition. The AWL provides important competition opportunities for national squad members as well as the next generation of Australian water polo talent. It is a national competition, featuring teams from all states across Australia and international players often join teams competing in the League, which helps create a high quality competition.

== National teams ==
The Australia men's national water polo team and Australia women's national water polo team represent Australia in international competitions. The inaugural Australian men's team was selected in 1907 and defeated New Zealand over a three match series at Lancaster Baths in Christchurch. Since then Australian men's teams have competed at every Olympic Games Water Polo Tournament from their Olympic debut in London (1948), excepting Mexico City (1968-controversially not nominated by the AOC) and Atlanta (1996-did not qualify). Australia were the inaugural Olympic gold medallists at the first Women's Olympic Games Water Polo Tournament in Sydney (2000), and have since won an Olympic silver medal at Paris (2024), and two Olympic bronze medals at Beijing (2008) and London (2012).

== Water Polo Australia Hall of Fame ==
The Water Polo Australia Hall of Fame was established by Water Polo Australia in 2009 to honour players, coaches and officials who have contributed greatly to water polo in Australia.

== See also ==
- Australia men's national water polo team
- Australia women's national water polo team
- Australian National Water Polo League
- Water Polo Australia Hall of Fame
- Water Polo in New South Wales
