= List of Australian mammal emblems =

This is a list of Australian mammal emblems.

Area represented	Image	Common name	Binomial nomenclature	Reference
Australia		Red kangaroo (unofficial)	Macropus rufus	
Australian Capital Territory		Southern Brush-tailed Rock-wallaby	Petrogale penicillata	
New South Wales		Platypus	Ornithorhynchus anatinus	
Northern Territory		Red kangaroo	Macropus rufus	
Queensland		Koala	Phascolarctos cinereus	
South Australia		Southern hairy-nosed wombat	Lasiorhinus latifrons	
Tasmania		Tasmanian devil	Sarcophilus harrisii	
Victoria		Leadbeater's possum	Gymnobelideus leadbeateri	
Western Australia		Numbat	Myrmecobius fasciatus	

== See also ==
- List of Australian bird emblems
- List of Australian floral emblems
