= District tartans of Australia =

Registered tartans for Australia, its capital city and States

Australian National tartan

District tartans for the Commonwealth of Australia and for each of its constituent States have been registered in the Scottish Register of Tartans (SRT). Additionally, fashion tartans covering either Australia as a whole, or its capital city, Canberra, have been registered in the SRT, as have district tartans in respect of some of Australia's local government areas.

Some of those registered tartans have been officially adopted, approved or procured by the relevant district. Most of the rest of them have been registered either with some form of official permission or support, or with the endorsement of an organisation based within the relevant district.

This article lists the registered tartans, and also provides information about their origins, registration, and legal status.

== Legal status ==
The SRT was established by the government of Scotland in November 2008, and was launched in February 2009. Its function is to record known historical tartans and register new tartan designs. Any person, from anywhere in the world, can apply to register a new tartan. For a design to be registered as a new tartan:

- the design must meet the definition of tartan contained in the Scottish Register of Tartans Act 2008;
- it must be a new design, unique to the Register, and
- there must be a clear link between the person registering the tartan and the proposed tartan name.

The name of a district will not be included in the name of a registered tartan unless the SRT has been satisfied that the inclusion of that district's name has at least some official backing. However, the registration of a tartan in the SRT as a district tartan, or as another type of tartan that includes the name of a district, does not automatically confer upon the tartan the status of an official symbol or emblem of the district, or any copyright or other protection.

None of the district or fashion tartans registered in the SRT and covering the whole of Australia have been officially adopted as a national symbol. However, the Australian National tartan was so named with the written permission of the then National Symbols Officer of the Department of the Prime Minister and Cabinet, and the Army Dress Manual of the Australian Army mandates the use of one of the other countrywide district tartans, namely The Australia tartan, in certain circumstances.

As indicated below, the tartans registered as the district tartans of the States of South Australia, Victoria, and, according to some sources (including the SRT itself), also Queensland and Tasmania, have been officially adopted, approved or procured by the relevant State. Additionally, and again as indicated below, some of the district tartans registered in respect of certain local government areas in Australia have similarly been officially adopted by the government of the relevant area.

== National tartans ==
=== Australian National tartan ===
The district tartan known as the Australian National tartan (shown above) was designed specifically as a national tartan by Betty Johnston of the House of Tartan, Canberra. It was recorded by the predecessor databases of the SRT with effect from 1 August 2002, and has since been registered in the SRT.

Earlier, on 22 March 2002, the then National Symbols Officer of the Department of the Prime Minister and Cabinet had given permission for the tartan to be described as the 'national tartan for Australia'. However, the letter of authorisation made clear that such use of the name 'did not mean' that the tartan had been, or would be, adopted as an official national symbol of Australia, and it has not since then been so adopted.

The tartan is made up of six colours, namely red, white, blue, green, gold, and black. The registration notes in its SRT entry state that:

"... red, white and blue are the colours of the Australia national flag; the six white stripes represent the Southern Cross constellation; the red and white stripes represent the English cross of St George; the white cross on a dark blue background represents the Scottish flag of St Andrew; the red diagonal cross represents St Patrick of Ireland; green and gold were proclaimed as Australia's national colours in 1984; the black stripes represent Australia as a convict settlement."

=== Other national tartans ===
The Australia tartan

Australia Dress tartan

Australia 2000 tartan

Australian Spirit tartan

Spirit of Australia tartan

Several other tartans have been registered as district tartans applying to the whole of Australia.

The Australia tartan (also known as the Australian tartan) was the winner of a national competition held by the Scottish Australian Heritage Council. It was designed by John Reid, a Melbourne architect, was recorded in the SRT's predecessor registers in 1984, and has since been registered in the SRT. It is also a registered design in Australia (No. 97439). The Australia tartan was launched in Sydney at the 1988 Scottish Week by Guest of Honour The (then) Countess of Sutherland. According to the registration notes in its SRT entry, its sett or pattern is that of the tartan of Lachlan Macquarie, who was appointed in 1809 as the second Scottish-born Governor of New South Wales, and its colours are "... based on ... the warm colours of the 'outback' ..."

Although The Australia tartan has never been recognised as an official national symbol, the Army Dress Manual mandates its use in certain circumstances. In particular:

"When two or more RAR Battalion Pipes and Drums Bands are on parade as a regiment, en masse, or with other units, they are only authorised to wear the Australian tartan."

The Australia Dress tartan was also designed by John Reid, and was intended to complement The Australia tartan. It was recorded by 1988 and later registered in the SRT. As with The Australia tartan, its sett is based on that of the tartan of Lachlan Macquarie. Another district tartan, known as the Australia 2000 tartan, was recorded prior to 2002 and has since been registered in the SRT. Its SRT entry provides very little further information about it.

Two additional tartans covering the whole of Australia are registered in the SRT as fashion tartans. The Australian Spirit tartan was designed by David McGill and registered on 13 January 2016. Its SRT entry describes it as "A fashion tartan for everyday wear using the historic green and gold colours of Australia." The Spirit of Australia tartan, designed by Greg McAdam of Perth, Western Australia, was registered on 25 January 2022. According to its SRT entry, it is:

"A fashion tartan for everyday wear to celebrate Australia and all it stands for: blue for the Oceans; red for the soils; yellow representing gold for the minerals; white for the sandy beaches and grey for Australia's necessary rains."

The designer, who operates a tartan shop, had been working on the design for some time when he was approached by Craig Hollywood, an Australian of Scottish origin. Hollywood had won the annual WA Local Hero award for his work with a charity, Short Back and Sidewalks, and was looking for a kilt to wear to the national award ceremony in Canberra. With that specific initial purpose in mind, the designer had the tartan registered as the Spirit of Australia tartan, on the basis that its design had been inspired by Australia's natural landscape. The federal MP for Perth, Patrick Gorman, provided an official letter of endorsement supporting the use of "Australia" in its name.

== Canberra tartan ==
City of Canberra tartan

The City of Canberra tartan was designed in 1997 by Peter Burrows and Stewart Smith, who were then members of the Canberra City Pipes and Drums band (CCPD). The tartan was also recorded that year, and has since been registered in the SRT. The CCPD had been established in 1990, and the tartan was created to assist in making the band "distinctively Canberra". The SRT entry for the tartan states that its colours are "... dark blue for the Canberra flag [sic], gold (yellow) and white for the stars on the Canberra flag and medium blue for the Canberra Bluebell."

Technically, the tartan is registered as a fashion tartan, not a district tartan. It has also not been formally adopted as an official emblem either of the city of Canberra, or of the Australian Capital Territory (ACT), of which the city is a part. However, the tartan is supported by the ACT Government and is worn by Canberra's official town crier.

Members of the CCPD have similarly worn the tartan during guest appearances at a number of Royal Edinburgh Military Tattoos, and also while performing at the Great Wall of China, Red Square in Moscow, and the XX Commonwealth Games, which were held in Glasgow in 2014.

A different tartan, known as the Hall tartan, was designed by Betty Johnston for the small village of Hall, in the north of the ACT near the border with New South Wales. It was registered by the SRT as a district tartan on 28 March 2017. The village is not governed separately from the rest of the ACT, and the tartan's registration was endorsed by the Hall Village & District Progress Association.

== State tartans ==
=== New South Wales ===
New South Wales tartan

The New South Wales tartan was designed in 1998 by Betty and Bradley Johnston of Murrumbateman. Its initial purpose was to raise funds for two charities, namely the Cerebral Palsy Association of Australia and the Motor Neurone Association of Australia.

On 4 May 2000, according to the tartan's entry in the SRT and the corresponding web page of the Scottish Tartans Authority (STA), the tartan was launched at Glen Innes, New South Wales, as the State tartan. However, it is not included in the list of State emblems published by the executive arm of the government of New South Wales. The tartan was recorded prior to the commencement of the SRT in 2009, and is also registered in the SRT as a district tartan. The records of the STA include the following:

"Design rationale: GREEN - Represents the sawtooth shaped green leaves of the floral emblem the Waratah flower, (Telopea speciosissima) the State Emblem proclaimed in 1962. Green also represents the evergreen perpetuity of the NSW tartan as one on the first registered and accredited Australian State tartans. RED - Red represents the Union Jack first raised on Australian soil by Captain James Cook at Sting Ray Harbour (Botany Bay) in 1770. Red is symbolic of the St George Cross and the Floral Emblem, the red Waratah (Telopea speciosissima). GOLD - Signifies the Golden Fleece, the sheaves of wheat and the rising sun, which symbolises agriculture in the State of NSW appearing on the coat of Arms. Gold is representative of the Golden Lion on the Cross of St George and the four, eight pointed stars representing the Southern Cross Constellation, which is unique to this hemisphere. BLACK - Signifies the uniqueness of the Black Opal found in the mines of North Western NSW. Is symbolic of the borders within Australia as the beginning of a penal colony."

District tartans have also been registered in the SRT in relation to the New South Wales local government areas covering Glen Innes, Queanbeyan, and Wagga Wagga, respectively. The Glen Innes tartan is an official logo of the Glen Innes Severn Council, and the design and registration of the Queanbeyan tartan were procured by the Queanbeyan–Palerang Regional Council, using funds provided by the government of New South Wales.

Glen Innes tartan

Queanbeyan tartan

Wagga Wagga tartan

=== Queensland ===
Queensland tartan

The design and first weaving of the Queensland tartan were completed in 1995 by Jack Allen, a Bundaberg cane farmer and "renowned weaver", after "four years in the planning". The tartan was showcased in an article in The Sunday Mail of Brisbane on 19 November 1995, and was also welcomed and praised by the Scottish Tartans Society. Before Allen died in May 1997, he asked the Society of St Andrew of Scotland (Bundaberg Branch) and the Scottish Clans Congress of Queensland to help him promote it.

According to the tartan's entry in the records of the STA, "There were unsuccessful representations to two governments". The tartan is not included in the lists of Queensland emblems published by the legislative and executive arms of the government of Queensland. However, another source asserts that the then Premier of Queensland, Peter Beattie, "officially approved" the tartan in May 2000, and the registration notes in its SRT entry as a district tartan declare that the then Governor of Queensland recorded its threadcount in the Lyon Court Books (writs section) on 6 February 2001. The SRT registration notes go on to provide the following explication of the tartan:

"Colours: white represents the small amount of cloud in the winter time; azure represents the clear blue winter sky; royal blue represents the Coral Sea, blue in Hervey Bay, Whitsunday Passage and Hinchinbrook; yellow represents the tropical beaches of Queensland, sun and sand; green represents the mountain forests, hardwood forests, pine forests, the grazing fields and farms; lilac represents the flowers of the sugar cane; crimson represents the States's floral emblem, the Cooktown Orchid."

The SRT also lists a district tartan for the small village of Dalveen in the local government area of Southern Downs Region. The tartan was designed and first woven by a then 83-year-old Dalveen resident, Norma Marsh, and was recorded by the STA in 2004 after being submitted by the Dalveen Sports Club. It has since been described as Dalveen's "very own tartan".

=== South Australia ===
South Australia Official tartan

The origins of the South Australia Official tartan can be traced back at least as far as about 1999, when a tartan designed by Betty Johnston and named the South Australia tartan was recorded, subject to the notation "Awaiting approval of the State to become the official tartan in 1999". When the STA later sought clarification from "Ann Brine of SA", the response was that "... no-one had ever seen it before and it certainly wasn't the official SA tartan". It is categorised by the SRT as a fashion tartan.

In 2008, a different tartan, also designed by Betty Johnston, was officially accepted by the "Scottish Association" as the State tartan. That tartan was recorded the same year (STA ref: 7956; STWR ref: 3281), and was subsequently registered in the SRT as a district tartan and named the South Australia Official tartan (SRT ref: 5990).

According to The Scottish Associations of South Australia:

"The ... tartan was designed to recognise the significance of the various colours associated with South Australia.

Red
Represents the Sturt's Desert Pea (Swainsona formosa) the State's official flower emblem proclaimed on 23rd November 1961, which is situated on the State official Coat of Arms. It further symbolises the Red Cross of St George on the Union Jack.

Black
Represents the piping shrike (or white backed magpie Gymnorhina tibicen teloncua) displayed proper on the gold background. The fine black lines depict the borders of this original historic free State of South Australia.

Gold
Symbolises the yellow rising sun of the Coat of arms of South Australia proclaimed official by Elizabeth II on 19th April 1984. It is one of South Australia's official State colours and the backdrop to the piping shrike on the coat of arm and the, which is centred on the state flag.

Blue
Represents the Flag of South Australia (based on the British Blue Ensign) proclaimed on 13th January 1904 as the State flag.

Green
Represents the grassy mount or grasslands, a symbol of agriculture on which rests South Australia's official Coat of Arms.

A combination of all the colours within the tartan is a reminder of the Desert Fire opal, the State gemstone emblem, adopted by the South Australian Government in 1985."

On 18 February 2018, the then Premier of South Australia, Jay Weatherill, announced that the South Australia Official tartan had "... officially been adopted for the State of South Australia." The tartan's official status is confirmed by a web page of the Department of the Premier and Cabinet of the government of South Australia, which identifies it by its STWR reference number.

=== Tasmania ===
Tasmanian tartan

The Tasmanian tartan was designed and first woven by Isabella Lamont Shorrock in about 1988. The designer had been born in Scotland, and had learned to weave with the help of members of the Handweavers, Spinners and Dyers Guild of Tasmania. She first presented the tartan to the Waverley Woollen Mills in Waverley, Northern Tasmania, but although the Woollen Mills were enthusiastic, they did not take the matter any further, for financial reasons.

The designer later opened the Lamont Weaving shop and studio in Bothwell, Tasmania, where she produced and sold both woollen and alpaca scarves featuring the design.

In 1999, Tamie Fraser, the wife of a past Prime Minister of Australia, Malcolm Fraser, officially opened the International Highland SPINin at Bothwell, and made the first presentation of the tartan to the public. Subsequently, the designer closed her shop and retired, and the original tartan was "not heard of" for a while. It was later purchased and put on display at the 2007 Bothwell SPINin, during which reproductions of it were available for sale.

The tartan was recorded prior to the launch of the SRT in 2009, and is also registered in the SRT as a district tartan. Although it is not included in the lists of State emblems and symbols published by the legislative and executive arms of the government of Tasmania, its entry in the SRT, and the corresponding web page of the STA's website, both assert that it was recognised in 1999 as the official State tartan. The explication of its colours by the organisers of the Bothwell SPINin, reproduced by both the SRT and the STA, is:

"The blue-green-grey, the rich red and the yellows found in Tasmania's Highland and Midland landscapes with their deep red soils, the blue gums and the wattles all of which are all so familiar to people who live in Tasmania."

=== Victoria ===
Victoria State (Official) tartan

The Victoria State (Official) tartan was designed by Betty Johnston and recorded in November 1998. It has since been registered in the SRT as a district tartan. In 2005, the State of Victoria acquired its copyright, and in June 2008 the then Premier of Victoria, John Brumby, announced that it had been adopted as the Victorian state tartan. As such, it is included in the list of state emblems published by the government of Victoria, which provides the following explication:

"The colours of the Victorian State tartan are blue, white, green and pink.

Blue represents the colours of the shield on the Victorian coat of arms and represents the background of the Eureka Stockade Flag.

The 5 white lines on the State Tartan represent the 5 white stars of the Southern Cross. These appear on both the Victorian coat of arms and the Eureka Stockade Flag.

Green represents the olive branch on the Victorian coat of arms.

Pink represents the Victorian floral emblem, the common heath."

The tartan is also the official tartan of the Melbourne Highland Games & Celtic Festival.

During an official visit to Balmoral Castle in Scotland on 5 October 2009, then Premier Brumby presented Queen Elizabeth II with a Victoria State tartan throw rug, together with matching ties for Prince Philip, Duke of Edinburgh, Prince Charles, the then Prince of Wales, and Princes William and Harry, and a neck scarf for Anne, Princess Royal.

The SRT has also registered district tartans for two of Victoria's regional cities. The Ballarat tartan was designed by Ben Cox of the Art Gallery of Ballarat, for the exhibition 'For Auld Lang Syne: Images of Scottish Australia, from First Fleet to Federation', which was held from April to July 2014. With the endorsement of the then Mayor of Ballarat, it was registered by the SRT on 12 February 2014, and it is also recorded by the STA. The Bendigo tartan was the brainchild of Chris Earl, director of the city's annual Scots Day Out. He completed its design on 14 September 2014, and in August 2015 it was officially adopted by the City of Greater Bendigo. The tartan was registered by the SRT on 9 September 2015, and its first bolt was rolled out in Rosalind Park, Bendigo, on 13 January 2016.

Ballarat tartan

Bendigo tartan

=== Western Australia ===
Western Australia (Scottish Associations) tartan

The Western Australia (Scottish Associations) tartan was designed by B & B Johnston. After being endorsed by Peter Watson, then the Member for Albany in the Western Australian Legislative Assembly, it was registered as a district tartan in the SRT on 22 November 2011. Earlier, on 23 May 2011, it had been recorded in the database of the STA.

The tartan's entry in the SRT and the corresponding web page of the STA provide the following explication:

"The predominantly black sett is historically and symbolically linked to the black swan, used as an emblem of the state of Western Australia from 1830. The red and green represent the floral emblem, the Red and Green Kangaroo paw. The red lines are also symbolic of the large land mass and extensive mineral wealth of Western Australia. The white reflects the Southern Cross Constellation which is unique to Australia."

The Caledonian Society of Albany have petitioned the Premier of Western Australia to have the tartan proclaimed as the Western Australia tartan. However, it is not included in the lists of State symbols published by the legislative and executive arms of the government of Western Australia.

== See also ==
- National symbols of Australia
- List of symbols of states and territories of Australia
- List of tartans
- Regional tartans of Canada, officially recognised tartans of the provinces and territories of Canada (created since the 1950s)
- List of U.S. state tartans, officially recognised tartans of states in the US (created since the 1980s)
- Sillitoe tartan, the nickname given to the distinctive chequered pattern that has become the ubiquitous symbol of policing in Australia
