= List of Australian floral emblems =

Australia and its states and territories each have an official floral emblem.

== History ==
After the Federation of Australia that took place in 1901, the increase in nationalism led to the search for an official national floral emblem. Archibald Campbell had founded the Wattle Club in Victoria in 1899 to promote interest in and profile of the wattle as a unique Australian flower. The New South Wales waratah was considered alongside the wattle Acacia pycnantha, although lost out to the latter in 1912. The economist and botanist R. T. Baker proposed that the waratah's endemism to the Australian continent made it a better choice than the wattle, as well as the prominence of its flowers. The South Australian Evening News also supported the bid, but to no avail.

In New South Wales, the New South Wales waratah was proclaimed as the official floral emblem of the state in 1962 by the governor Sir Eric Woodward, after being used informally for many years.

The Cooktown orchid (Vappodes phalaenopsis), was the official floral emblem of Queensland since 19 November 1959.

In November 1960, Anigozanthos manglesii was adopted as the floral emblem of Western Australia in a proclamation made by Premier David Brand, to promote tourist interest in the state's wildflowers. He had been advised by the state's Tourist Development Authority.

The South Australian policy adopted Sturt's desert pea (Swainsona formosa) as the floral emblem of South Australia on 23 November 1961.

The Tasmanian Government proclaimed Eucalyptus globulus as their state floral emblem on 5 December 1962, however it is rarely seen as an official or popular emblem. This led to the Tasmanian branch of the Association of Societies for Growing Australian Plants promoting the attractive flower Eucryphia lucida as an alternative in 1966.

The golden wattle (Acacia pycnantha) was officially proclaimed the floral emblem of Australia on 1 September 1988.

Australia's state flowers have been featured on series of postage stamps twice—a set of six stamps in July 1968, each showing the flowers of one state, and a series of seven stamps, showing the six state flowers and the golden wattle, in March 2014. The Sturt's desert pea and golden wattle were also featured on a series of definitive stamps in 1970.

== List ==
Area represented	Image	Common name	Binomial nomenclature	Reference
Australia		Golden wattle	Acacia pycnantha	
Australian Capital Territory		Royal bluebell	Wahlenbergia gloriosa	
New South Wales		New South Wales waratah	Telopea speciosissima	
Northern Territory		Sturt's desert rose	Gossypium sturtianum	
Queensland		Cooktown orchid	Vappodes phalaenopsis	
South Australia		Sturt's desert pea	Swainsona formosa	
Tasmania		Tasmanian blue gum	Eucalyptus globulus	
Victoria		Pink (common) heath	Epacris impressa	
Western Australia		Red and green kangaroo paw	Anigozanthos manglesii	

== See also ==
- List of Australian bird emblems
- List of Australian mammal emblems
