= List of Australian bird emblems =

This is a list of Australian bird emblems.

Area represented	Image	Common name	Binomial nomenclature	Reference
Australia		Emu	Dromaius novaehollandiae	
Australian Capital Territory		Gang-gang cockatoo	Callocephalon fimbriatum	
New South Wales		Laughing kookaburra	Dacelo novaeguineae	
Northern Territory		Wedge-tailed eagle	Aquila audax	
Queensland		Brolga	Grus rubicunda	
South Australia		Piping shrike	Gymnorhina tibicen telonocua	
Tasmania		Yellow wattlebird (unofficial)	Anthochaera paradoxa	
Victoria		Helmeted honeyeater	Lichenostomus melanops cassidix	
Western Australia		Black swan	Cygnus atratus	

== See also ==
- List of Australian mammal emblems
- List of Australian floral emblems
