= Batocara =

Scientific classification
- Domain: Eukaryota
- Kingdom: Animalia
- Phylum: Arthropoda
- Clade: †Artiopoda
- Class: †Trilobita
- Order: †Phacopida
- Family: †Encrinuridae
- Genus: †Batocara; Strusz, 1980

Synonyms
- Pacificurus

Genus of trilobites

Batocara is a genus of phacopid trilobites in the family Encrinuridae. The type species, B. bowningi, was described originally as Encrinurus bowningi by Foerste in 1888. In 1980, D.L. Strusz erected Batocara for 'Encrinurus' bowningi. Batocara also contains the species B. borenorense, Batocara tuberosus and B. fritillum.
