= National colours of Australia =

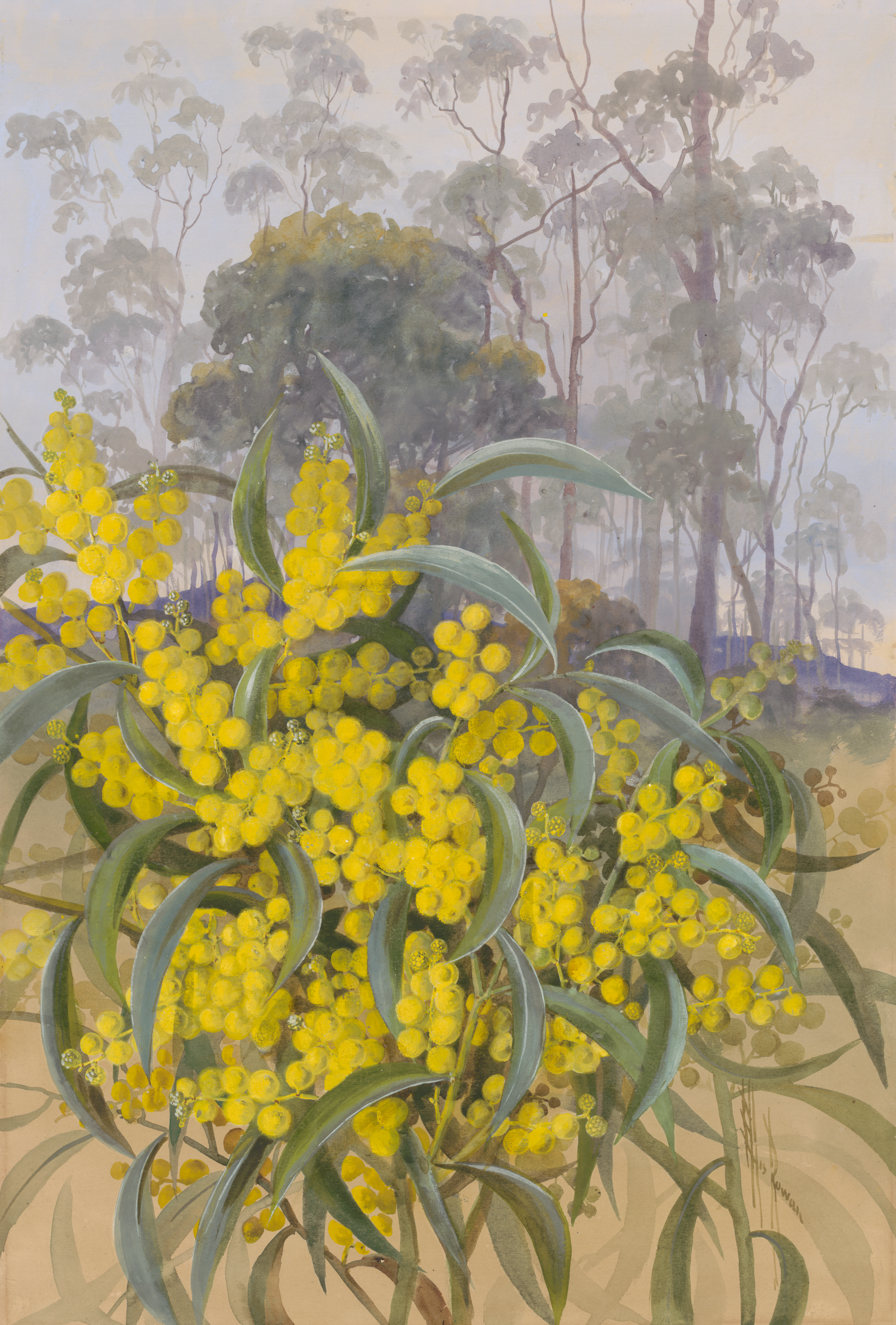
Painting of golden wattle, by Ellis Rowan, a possible inspiration for the choice of colours

The national colours of Australia are green and gold. They were formally adopted by the governor-general of Australia, Sir Ninian Stephen, on 19 April 1984 in the Commonwealth of Australia Gazette; on the advice from Prime Minister Bob Hawke.

== History ==
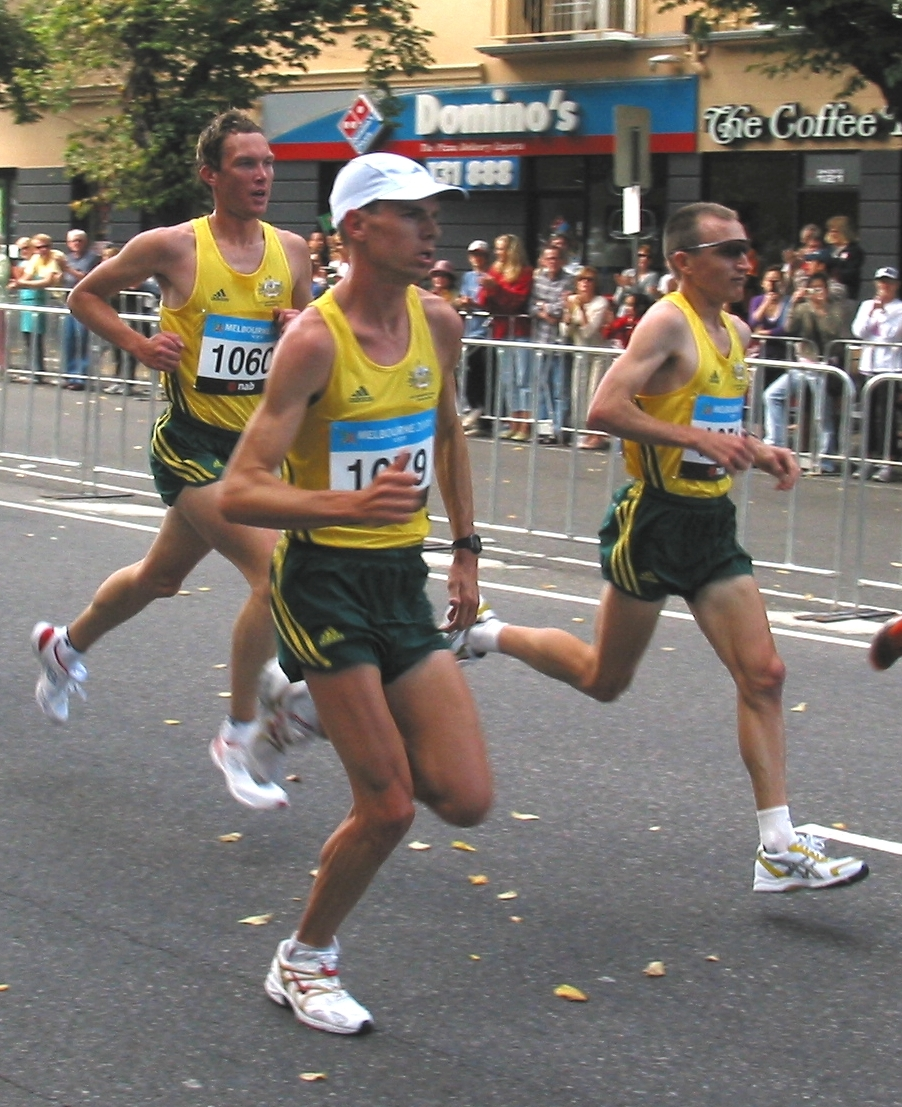
Australian marathon runners wearing green and gold at the 2006 Commonwealth Games

The first Australian national sporting team to wear green and gold was the Australia cricket team that toured England in 1899. Their clothes were the traditional white, but the captain Joe Darling arranged for green and gold caps and blazers to be worn for the opening match of the Ashes series. Previously, the team had had no uniform cap or blazer colours but wore an assortment of club or state colours. The Australian cricket team continued to use the colours thereafter, and in 1908 the colours were ratified as the official team colours for future Australia cricket teams. During subsequent discussions by members of the New South Wales Cricket Association, the colours were reportedly referred to as "gum-tree green" and "wattle-gold".

The Australasian Olympic team adopted "green and wattle" in 1908, but not every team played in the colours. In the 1912 Olympics, an official Australian uniform was adopted for the first time: green vests with gold trimming, and white shorts with green and gold trimming.

Of the football codes, the Australian national soccer team first wore green and gold in 1924 with the national rugby league team and rugby union team following in 1928 and 1929 respectively.

== Description ==
	Green	Gold	Sources
Pantone	348 C	116 C	
RGB (Hex)	0–132–61 (#00843D)	255–205–0 (#FFCD00)	
CMYK	100%–0%–54%–48%	0%–20%–100%–0%	

The gold colour represents the golden wattle (Acacia pycnantha), which is Australia's national flower. The uniforms of Australia's national sports teams are usually green and gold. The golden wattle flower, and the colours green and gold, are also featured on the Coat of arms of Australia.

According to the Australian government, "green and gold have been popularly embraced as Australia’s national sporting colours" since the late 1800s. Nearly every current Australian national sports team wears them (although the hues and proportions of the colours may vary between teams and across eras). Australia's cricket team first wore the colours in 1899, in the form of the baggy green, the cap presented to Australian cricket players.

The Australian government states that, to be used correctly, the colours are placed side-by-side, with no other colour between them. The exact green and gold colours are specified as Pantone Matching System numbers 348C and 116C. The colours are always referred to as 'green and gold'.

=== Alternatives ===
1908–1928, 1963, 2008, 2014

Other colour combinations have been used to represent Australia:

- blue (NSW) and maroon (Qld) together have been used by the Australia national rugby league team from 1908-1928 and again on commemorative jerseys, and by the Australia national rugby union team from 1899-1929.
- The colours of the national flag: red, white and blue, and
- The heraldic colours of Australia: blue and gold.

== Uses ==
=== Sports teams ===
Teams that wear the green and gold include:

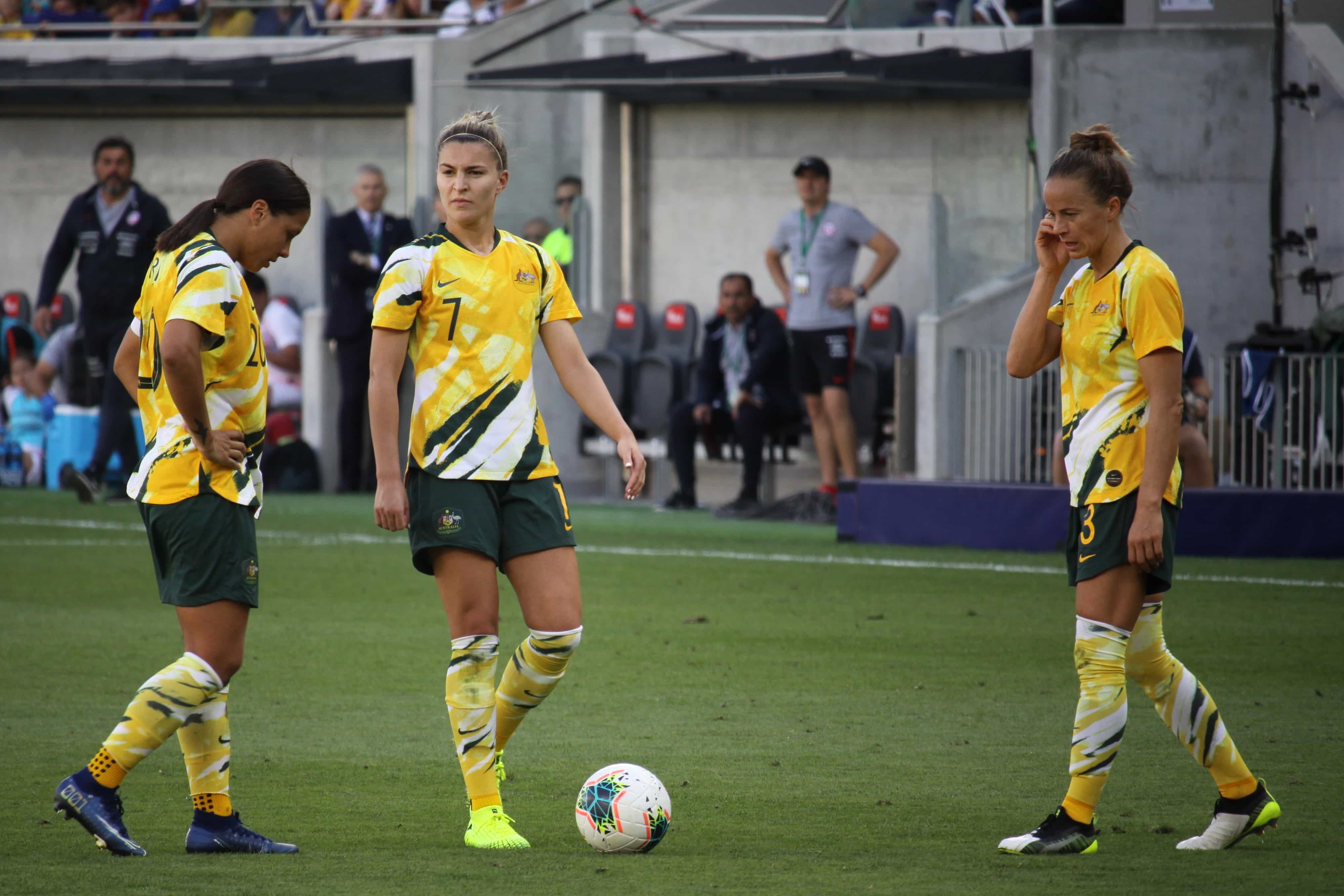
The Matildas in 2019.

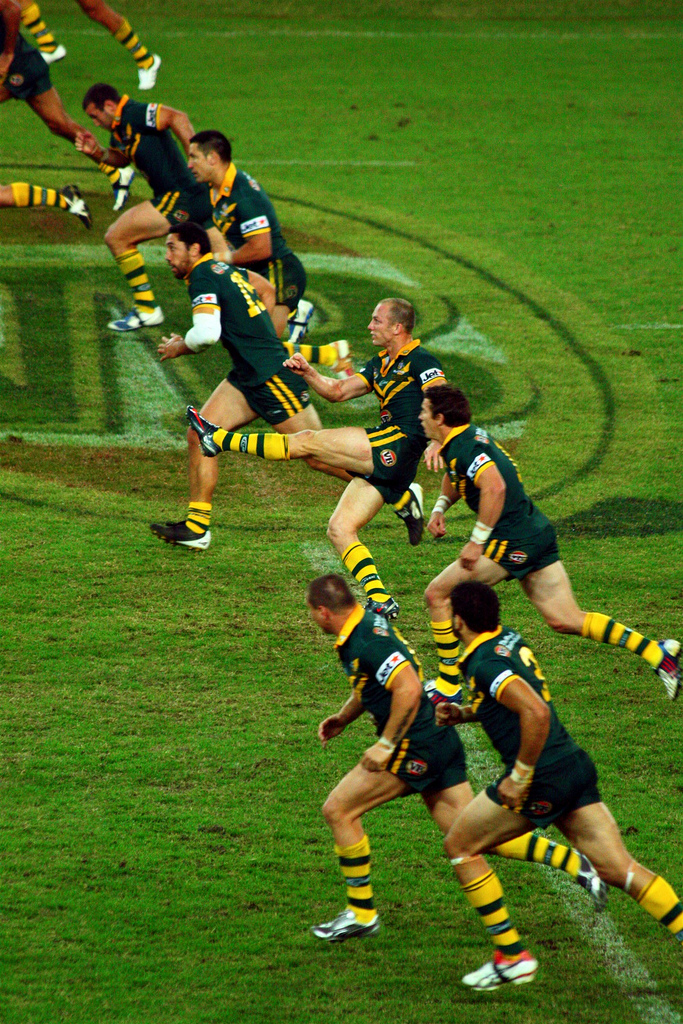
The Kangaroos in 2008.

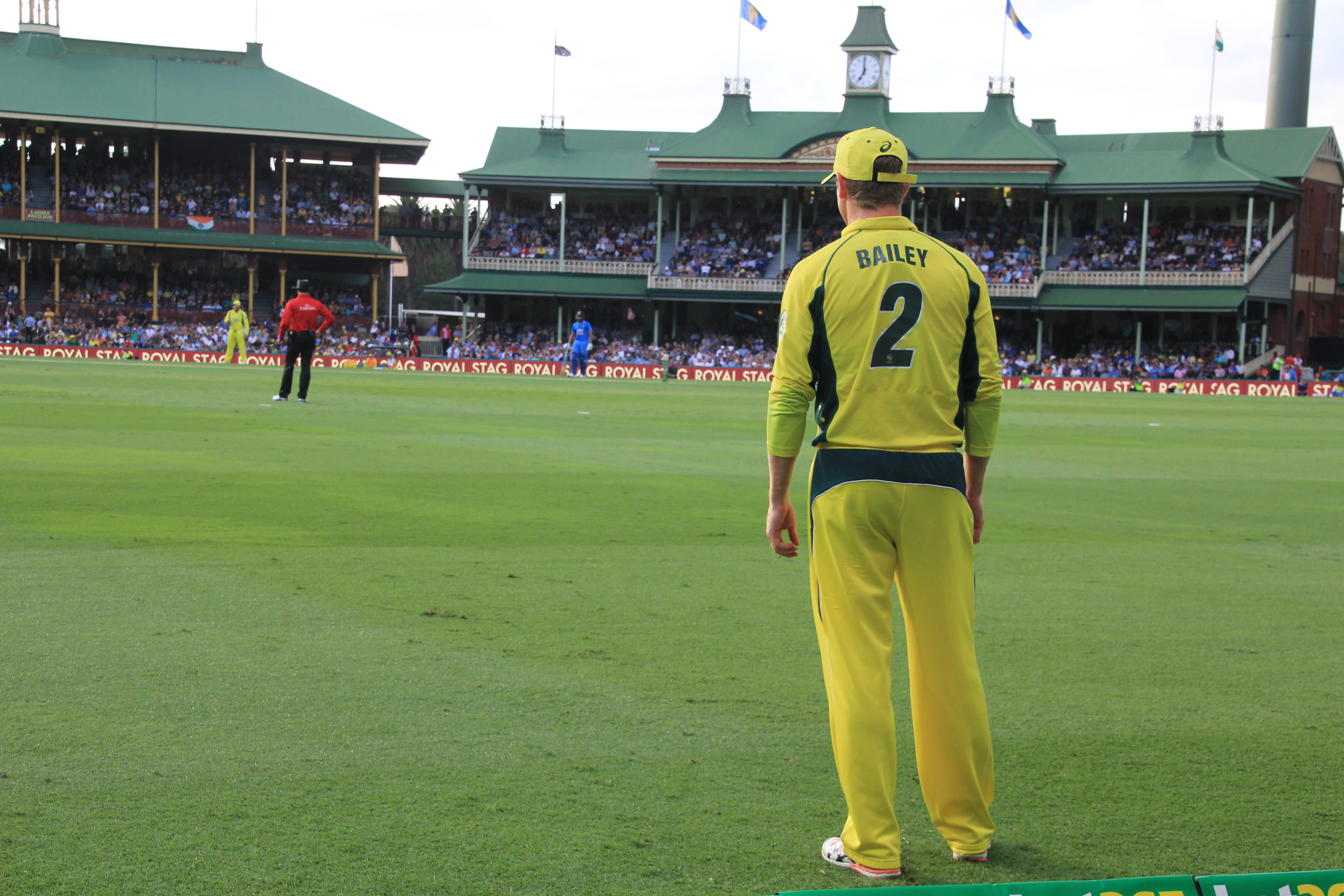
George Bailey in Australian ODI cricket uniform, 2016.

- the Australia cricket team (one day cricket and Twenty20 cricket);
- the Australia Summer Olympics team;
- the Wallabies (men's rugby union);
- the Wallaroos (women's rugby union);
- the Kangaroos (men's rugby league);
- the Jillaroos (women's rugby league);
- the Diamonds (netball);
- the Socceroos (men's association football);
- the Matildas (women's association football);
- the Boomers (men's basketball);
- the Opals (women's basketball);
- the Kookaburras (men's field hockey);
- the Hockeyroos (women's field hockey);
- the Mighty Roos (ice hockey);
- the Volleyroos (men's volleyball);
- the Australia Davis Cup team (men's tennis);
- the Australia Fed Cup team (women's tennis);
- the Australia national touch football teams;
- the Australia men's national baseball team;
- the Emeralds (women's baseball);
- the Sharks (men's field lacrosse);
- the Australia women's national lacrosse team (women's lacrosse);
- the Australia national indoor lacrosse team (box lacrosse);
- Team Australia on UFC The Smashes The Ultimate Fighter: The Smashes
- the Wizards of Aus Australian men's roller derby team
- The Australian Outback Gridiron Team
- The Australia national dodgeball Team
- The Australia ISDE team (motorcycle enduro)
- The Auroras, Australian Dragon Boat Racing Team

Since 1961, the Wallabies have worn a gold jersey with green trim; they changed from a primarily green jersey to avoid a colour clash with the Springboks of South Africa.

=== Companies and organisations ===
From around 1981 the colours were also used in the livery of the government railway body Australian National, formed by the 1970s merger of Commonwealth Railways with the state-run South Australian Railways and Tasmanian Government Railways. Australian National was privatised in 1997.

- Australian Made logo
- Australian National Line
- Medicare Australia
- National Party of Australia

== See also ==
- Australian state colours
- Coat of arms of Australia
- Boxing kangaroo flag
