= Scottish Tartans Authority =

Scottish organization preserving tartans and Highland dress

The coat of arms of the Scottish Tartans Authority, granted in 2004

The Scottish Tartans Authority (STA) is a Scottish registered charity dedicated to the promotion, protection and preservation of Scotland's national cloth. Founded in 1995, the charitable purposes of the Authority are:

- to protect, preserve, conserve, promote and explain the culture, traditions and uses of Scottish Tartans and highland dress; and
- to advance and promote the education of the public about Scottish Tartans and Highland Dress and their respective origins, manufacture, use and development.

With the assistance of members and stakeholders, the STA fields enquiries each year and works in partnership with, and as advisors to, a range of public and private bodies.

The STA holds a collection of tartan and highland dress, costume, textiles, tartan records, manuscripts, books, other important artefacts. It holds details of c. 10,000 tartans within its core database, and a number of items from the collection are on loan to various museums, notably National Museums Scotland, V&A Dundee, the Braemar Highland Games Centre, and the Gordon Highlanders Museum.

== History ==
The authority was founded in 1995.

In November 2008, the Scottish Parliament passed the Scottish Register of Tartans Act and the Scottish Register of Tartans was launched in February 2009. At this point, the STA relinquished its registration responsibilities, having already gifted the contents of its core database to the National Records of Scotland to assist in the setting up of The Scottish Register of Tartans (SRT).

In 2017, the Scottish Tartans Authority gained the Royal Patronage of HRH The Prince Charles, Prince of Wales and Duke of Rothesay. Following the death of Queen Elizabeth II in September 2022, a formal review of Royal Patronages was instigated.

== Publications ==
- Scottish Tartans Authority (7 September 2017). Clans and Tartans: Traditional Scottish Tartans (Collins Little Books). Glasgow: HarperCollins UK. ISBN 978-0-00-826693-6.

== See also ==
- Scottish Register of Tartans
