= Coat of arms of Tasmania =

Official symbol of Australian state

Versions
- State Badge of Tasmania
- Adopted: May 1917
- Crest: A lion passant Gules resting the dexter forepaw on a spade and a pick-axe in saltire proper
- Torse: Argent and Gules
- Shield: Quarterly Gules and barry wavy Argent and Azure, a Fesse of the second charged with a Ram statant proper between in chief a Garb and a Thunderbolt and in base four Apples and a branch of Hops all Or
- Supporters: On either side a Tasmanian tiger proper
- Motto: Ubertas et Fidelitas "Fertility and Faithfulness"

The coat of arms of Tasmania is an official symbol of the Australian state of Tasmania. It was granted by King George V in May 1917. The shield features significant examples of Tasmanian industry: a sheaf of wheat, hops, a ram and apples. It is surmounted by a red lion that also features on the state badge. The shield is supported by two thylacines (Tasmanian tigers/wolves) with a motto beneath, Ubertas et Fidelitas, which is Latin for "Fertility and Faithfulness".

The formal description, or blazon, of the arms is: Quarterly Gules and barry wavy Argent and Azure a Fesse of the second charged with a Ram statant proper between in chief a Garb and a Thunderbolt and in base four Apples and a Branch of Hops all Or; For the Crest on a Wreath Argent and Gules: A Lion passant Gules resting the dexter forepaw on a Spade and a Pick-axe in saltire proper; And for Supporters, on either side A Tasmanian Tiger proper, with the Motto "Ubertas et Fidelitas".

The Tasmanian coat of arms is rarely seen nowadays, except on official government publications or in government buildings. It has been replaced for the most part by the new government logo of a Tasmanian tiger peeking through tall grass.

== See also ==
- Australian heraldry
