= Australian state and territory colours =

In Australia, state and territory colours are frequently part of a state or territory's set of state symbols.

Some states have formally adopted a set of colours as their official "state colours" while others have de facto state colours that have become well-known through popular use. State colours often appear on a variety of different media, from the state's flag to the colours used in sports. In particular the Sheffield Shield team caps popularised the usage of single colours to represent each state. The colours of state schools have been synonymous with states, whereby you find Queensland Public Schools are primarily Maroon, and Western Australian Public Schools are Bottle Green. This does not come without exception however.

State/territory name	Current population	State/territory flag	Main colour	Hex Code	Secondary colours	Further information
Australian Capital Territory	454,499		Blue	003087	Gold and White	see Sport in Australian Capital Territory
New South Wales	8,072,163		Sky Blue or Blue	CBEDFD	Navy Blue and White	see Sport in New South Wales
Northern Territory	232,605		Red Ochre	C75B12	Black and White	see Sport in Northern Territory
Queensland	5,156,138		Maroon	73182C	White and Gold	see Symbols of Queensland
South Australia	1,781,516		Red	D50032	Gold and Dark Blue	see Sport in South Australia
Tasmania	557,571		Bottle Green	006747	Yellow and Maroon	see Sport in Tasmania
Victoria	6,503,491		Navy Blue	201547	Silver and White	see Sport in Victoria
Western Australia	2,660,026		Gold	FFD100	Black and White	see Sport in Western Australia

== See also ==
- National colours of Australia
- List of symbols of states and territories of Australia
- State of Origin
- Interstate matches in Australian rules football
