= Scottish Register of Tartans =

Scottish government department for the recording of tartans

- Coat of arms

Non-ministerial department overview
- Formed: February 5, 2009
- Headquarters: New Register House; 55.9542°N 3.1902°W
- Keeper responsible: Angus Robertson
- Parent department: National Records of Scotland
- Website: tartanregister.gov.uk

The Scottish Register of Tartans (SRT) is Scotland's official non-ministerial government department and digital database for the recording and registration of tartan designs, operating since 5 February 2009. As a governmental body, SRT is headquartered at General Register House in Edinburgh, though it accepts tartan designs from around the world. SRT is the centralised agency for the recording of known historical tartans and for paid registration of new tartan designs, which must fulfill fairly stringent criteria. SRT subsumed this registration role from a variety of previous not-for-profit and commercial organisations, most now defunct. Since December 2018, the Keeper of the Scottish Register of Tartans is the head of the NRS (who is also the Keeper of Records and Registrar General for Scotland more broadly). It is uncertain how large the database is, but it has absorbed records of at least 7,000 tartans from previous registries, in addition to accepting new entries from 2009 onward.

== History ==
Scottish Register of Tartans Act 2008
- Act of the Scottish Parliament
- Scottish Parliament
- Long title: An Act of the Scottish Parliament to establish a register of tartans; and for connected purposes.
- Citation: 2008 asp 7

Dates
- Royal assent: 13 November 2008
Other legislation
Amended by	Public Services Reform (Scotland) Act 2010

Status: Amended

Text of statute as originally enacted

Text of the Scottish Register of Tartans Act 2008 as in force today (including any amendments) within the United Kingdom, from legislation.gov.uk.

The Government of Scotland had been considering sponsoring an official register of tartans, following a member's bill submitted by Jamie McGrigor MSP in February 2007. On 9 October 2008, the Scottish Parliament passed the "Scottish Register of Tartans Bill" (or "Tartans Bill" for short). On 13 November 2008, the bill received royal assent as the Scottish Register of Tartans Act 2008 (asp 7). The register's website was publicly launched on 5 February 2009. It is a division of the National Records of Scotland (NRS), formerly of the National Archives of Scotland (NAS) before its merger into NRS.

The Keeper of the Scottish Register of Tartans is the same person as the Keeper of the Records of Scotland and Registrar General for Scotland – roles that merged with the merger of the National Archives of Scotland (NAS) and General Register Office for Scotland (GROS) into the National Records of Scotland (NRS) in 2011. Since December 2018, this has been NRS Chief Executive Paul Lowe.

== Database of tartans ==
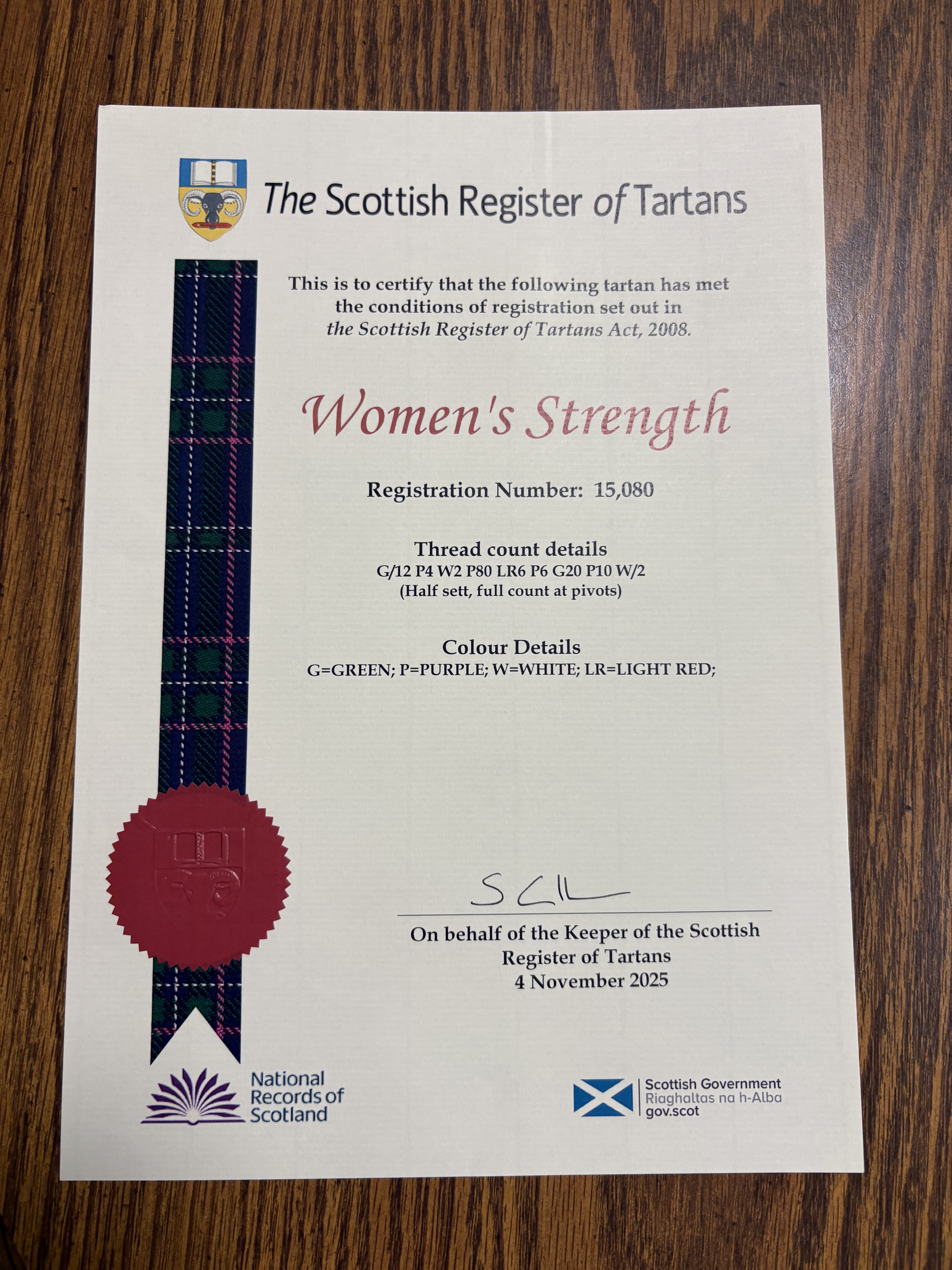
A certificate of registration from the Scottish Register of Tartans.

SRT's database, also named simply Scottish Register of Tartans (SRT), is accessible without fee via the website TartanRegister.gov.uk. The purpose of the register is to provide a definitive and accessible resource to preserve specific tartan designs, including their thread counts. The data set comprises the pre-existing registrations of at least 7,000 tartans from the Scottish Tartans Authority (STA) International Tartan Index (ITI), which in turn had absorbed those of the Scottish Tartans Society (STS) Register of All Publicly Known Tartans (RAPKT) and the IATS–TECA TartanArt Database a.k.a. International Registry of Tartans (IRT). The SRT also includes the records of the self-titled Scottish Tartans World Register (STWR) database, which were mostly but not entirely duplicative of the combined ITI records. From its 5 February 2009 launch date, SRT includes new registrations not found in any prior collections. Consequently, the SRT database includes all known records of historical tartans as well as many modern ones, which are often asserted to be intellectual property of particular individuals and organisations. The SRT database uses its own index-numbering system, while also preserving the ITI and STWR numbers when such designations already exist for a particular tartan. However, the ITI is still being independently developed, mostly to correct old errors and to record newly discovered historical examples.

SRT users can register new tartans for a fee via the website or post, search for and request the thread counts of existing tartans (after registering for a free account), and receive notifications of newly registered tartans. The criteria for a new registration are fairly restrictive, requiring a clearly distinct name following one of several prescribed patterns, which must not confusingly misuse various pre-defined terms; authority to use the name, especially if it implies official recognition and acceptance by a clan, an organisation, or a jurisdiction; a design "sufficiently different" from all previously recorded tartans; and either a woven sample, a photograph thereof, or an accurate digitally rendered picture of the tartan. Thus, a significant amount of research and documentation is required, and the application fee is non-refundable, including upon rejection of an application. Amendments to SRT-specific records require a fee, but may be declined if they would effectively result in a new design; correction of errors in data imported from ITI or STWR do not require fees but generally require documentation.

Between 1951 and 1992, the Lord Lyon King of Arms has recorded (or "noted") 28 distinct tartans in the Public Register of All Arms and Bearings in Scotland and a further 39 in the Lyon Court Book, for a total of 74 including some minor variations. These were recorded for certain specific purposes, usually official designation by clan chiefs and by authorized representatives of organisations (some as far removed from Scotland as Canadian provinces and a United States military academy). The office of the Lord Lyon has ceased direct tartan-recording activities, except in theory by direct petition from a clan chief or from a city or other government as a matter of heraldry. All of these tartans are also included in ITI and thus in STR.

== Intellectual property ==
Registering with SRT does not automatically confer a copyright registration in the usual sense, but the application process provides for the recording of any asserted copyright status, which is sufficient under the Berne Copyright Convention. Any applicable trade mark assertion can also be recorded with an application. Registry entries for a tartan may show copyright or trademark registration numbers from other bodies, such as the UK Intellectual Property Office, if submitted with the application or later in a registry amendment request. SRT also permits registrants to record usage-restriction preferences in their tartan records (such as use only by family or organisation members), though there are no actual legal statutes by which such restrictions could be enforced, only an informal sense of tartan etiquette. For intellectual property purposes, inclusion in the Scottish Register of Tartans "provides evidence of the existence and date of [the] design".

== Reception ==
A pre-emptive concern raised by tartan researcher James D. Scarlett (2008) was that basing the SRT database on ITI and/or STWR would import data "so seriously flawed and muddled as to be nearly impossible to correct"; Scarlett suggested instead using the smaller but "cleaner" database of the STS (RAPKT), of which he was the keeper. Nevertheless, the SRT was initially based on both ITI and STWR.

Brian Wilton of the STA (2010) was critical of SRT and NAS's management of it, in that its exclusivity, in both cost and criteria, could mean that it cannot actually achieve its goals of definitiveness, preservation, and open access. The STA's ITI, for example, contained a number of late-added tartans that did not appear in the SRT, and the gulf would only seem to widen, with SRT and STA both continuing to add new tartans to their databases independently.

Intellectual property academic M. R. Blakely (2015) critically observed that the SRT does not limit tartan registrations to Scottish persons and organisations, nor include compulsory licensing of registered tartans for Scottish production, despite direct Scottish economic benefits being part of the rationale for the Tartans Bill in 2008 that authorised SRT's operation. Many SRT registrations are by foreign persons and organisations, and they can assert copyright and trademark rights over the designs, limiting manufacture to approved parties.

Lauren Brancaz (2016) of the Centre for Breton and Celtic Research wrote that the SRT is the most comprehensive tartan database so far, and that its creation and success, and acceptance by the industry, are evidence (along with Scottish governmental involvement in Tartan Day festivities outside and now within Scotland, along with a 2010 government Diaspora Engagement Plan) that the Scottish government, and perhaps the Scottish public, are re-engaging with tartan as a symbol and product of value to Scotland (after several decades of Scottish disaffection toward tartan), and worth Scottish investment in both production and regulation or control, even as input from the Scottish diaspora plays a part.
