= William Ernest Cooke =

Australian astronomer

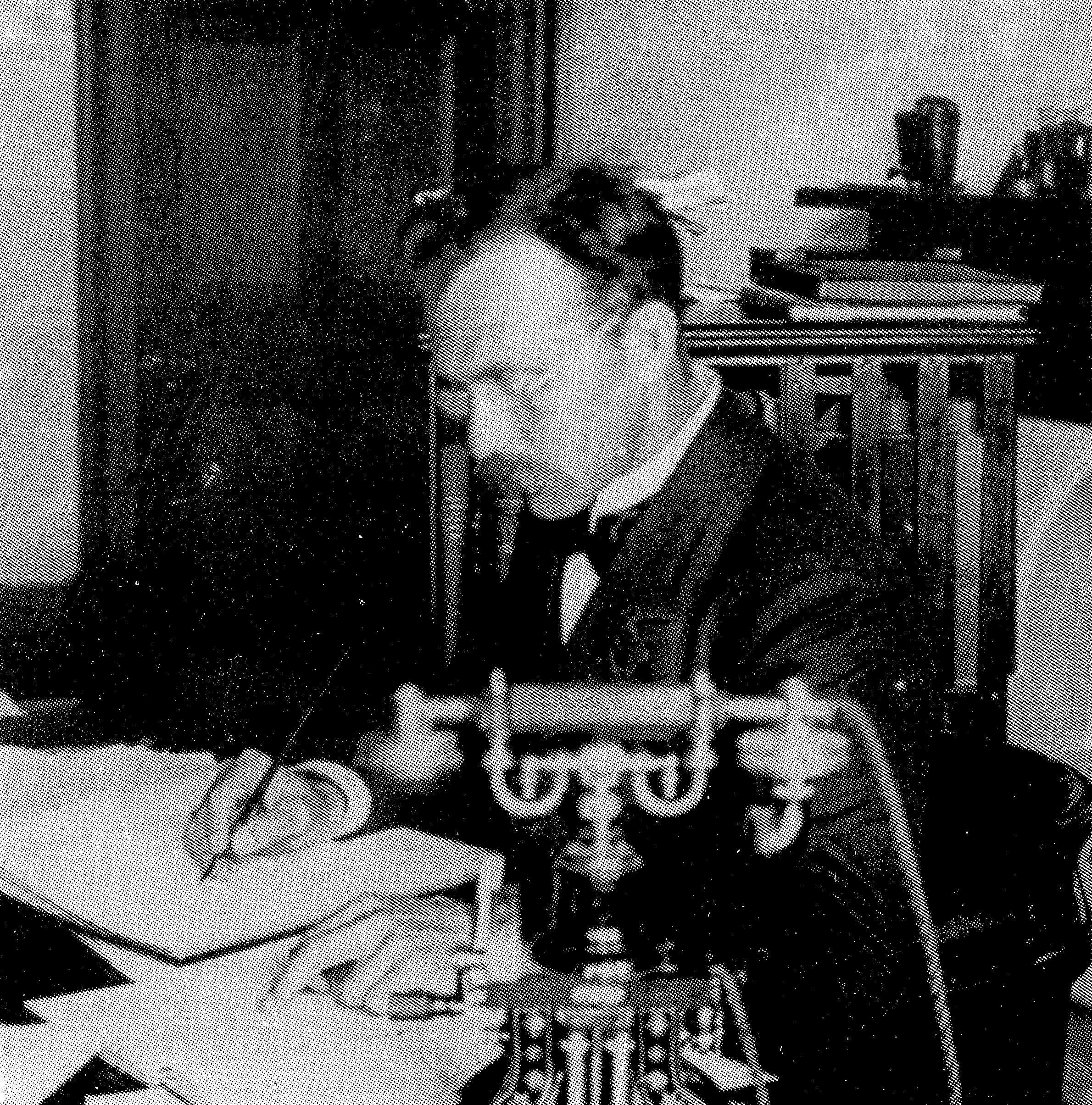
- Cooke in 1909
- Born: 25 July 1863; Adelaide, Australia
- Died: 7 November 1947 (aged 84); Adelaide, Australia
- Occupation: Astronomer

William Ernest Cooke (25 July 1863 – 7 November 1947), generally referred to as W. Ernest Cooke or informally Ernest Cooke, was an Australian astronomer, credited with a number of important scientific breakthroughs and improved methodologies in astronomical observations and star cataloguing. He was the first Western Australian Government Astronomer and established the Perth Observatory as one of the best equipped and productive establishments of its type in Australia.

Cooke was born in Adelaide, the son of Ebenezer Cooke, public servant and politician from South Australia. He was educated at The Collegiate School of St Peter in Adelaide (1875–79) and the University of Adelaide (B.A., 1883; M.A., 1889).

Cooke did well at school: in 1879 he was first placed in St Peter's First Class of matriculants, with passes in Greek and Chemistry. He signed the student roll at the University of Adelaide in March the same year, while he was still 15. After a glowing reference from his headmaster, he took a Civil Service cadetship under Sir Charles Todd at the Adelaide Observatory in December 1878. He was awarded a Bachelor of Arts degree in 1883 and a Master of Arts in 1889.

Cooke married Jessie Elizabeth Greayer in Adelaide in 1887 and they had six children—five before arriving in Western Australia: Violet Ogden (1888), Lionel Ernest (1889), Rosalie (1891, died in infancy), Frank Basil (1892), and Erica Carrington (1894). The sixth child, Maxwell Greayer was born in Perth in 1898.

== Career ==
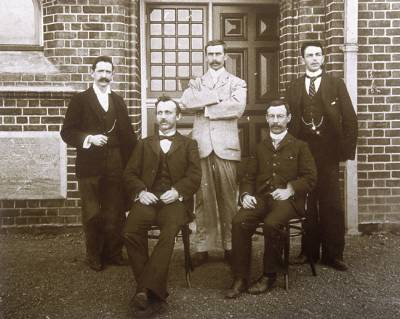
Perth Observatory staff, c. 1900. Cooke is seated at the left. His successor Harold Curlewis, is standing in the light coloured suit

In about 1882 he was appointed as senior assistant, second class at the Adelaide Observatory.

In the mid-1890s, Todd was advising the Premier of Western Australia Sir John Forrest who wanted to build a high quality Perth Observatory in Western Australia. In December 1894 he wrote to Forrest advising that the £3,000 which had been set aside in the budgets for construction was sufficient and would be adequate for the purchase of instruments also. A site was chosen and endorsed by Todd during a one-week visit to Perth in July 1895. With regards to an astronomer, Todd wrote:

The appointment of an astronomer of course requires very careful consideration and I am glad to call your attention to Mr W. E. Cooke, M.A., my first Assistant who would, I have reason to know, accept the office if offered it.

Mr Cooke has been employed in the observatory here, under my direction, for about 13 years, and has full experience in all Astronomical and Meteorological work. He is a most proficient Mathematician and had a distinguished career at Adelaide University.

He is about 32 or 33 years of age, and therefore in the full vigour of young manhood – he is very zealous in his work, very steady, and high principled, and is married.

From my intimate knowledge of him, and his special attainments I can write with confidence to commend him as the very man you want. You certainly could not do better if you went to England and very probably would not get so good a man.

The foundation stone was laid by Forrest on 29 September 1896 and the Observatory was completed at a cost of £6,622, more than double the estimate, on 3 March 1897. Cooke meanwhile was sent on a tour of continental cities to study observatory design and to purchase instruments. He visited Paris, Nice, Strasbourg and Brussels, as well as visiting Her Majesty's Astronomer at the Cape of Good Hope. He arrived in Perth on 7 November 1896 but it would be two years before the first of the two main instruments would be commissioned. In the interim, he established a first-class meteorological station in the Observatory grounds, with observations continuing to be made there until 1967. Cooke toured the state extensively, visiting as far north as Wyndham and inland along the Murchison River. He established several new meteorological stations along the way, training local observers and equipping the stations. Weather data was transmitted from the country stations twice a day to the General Post Office in Perth by telegraph. He established a number of voluntary observation posts who transmitted weather data on a monthly basis. Using the observations, he produced the first daily weather maps and daily forecasts, for Perth, the Goldfields and the state. By about 1900, a general weather report, a special rainfall report, an isobar map and a forecast were produced each morning and posted for viewing in Perth and Fremantle.

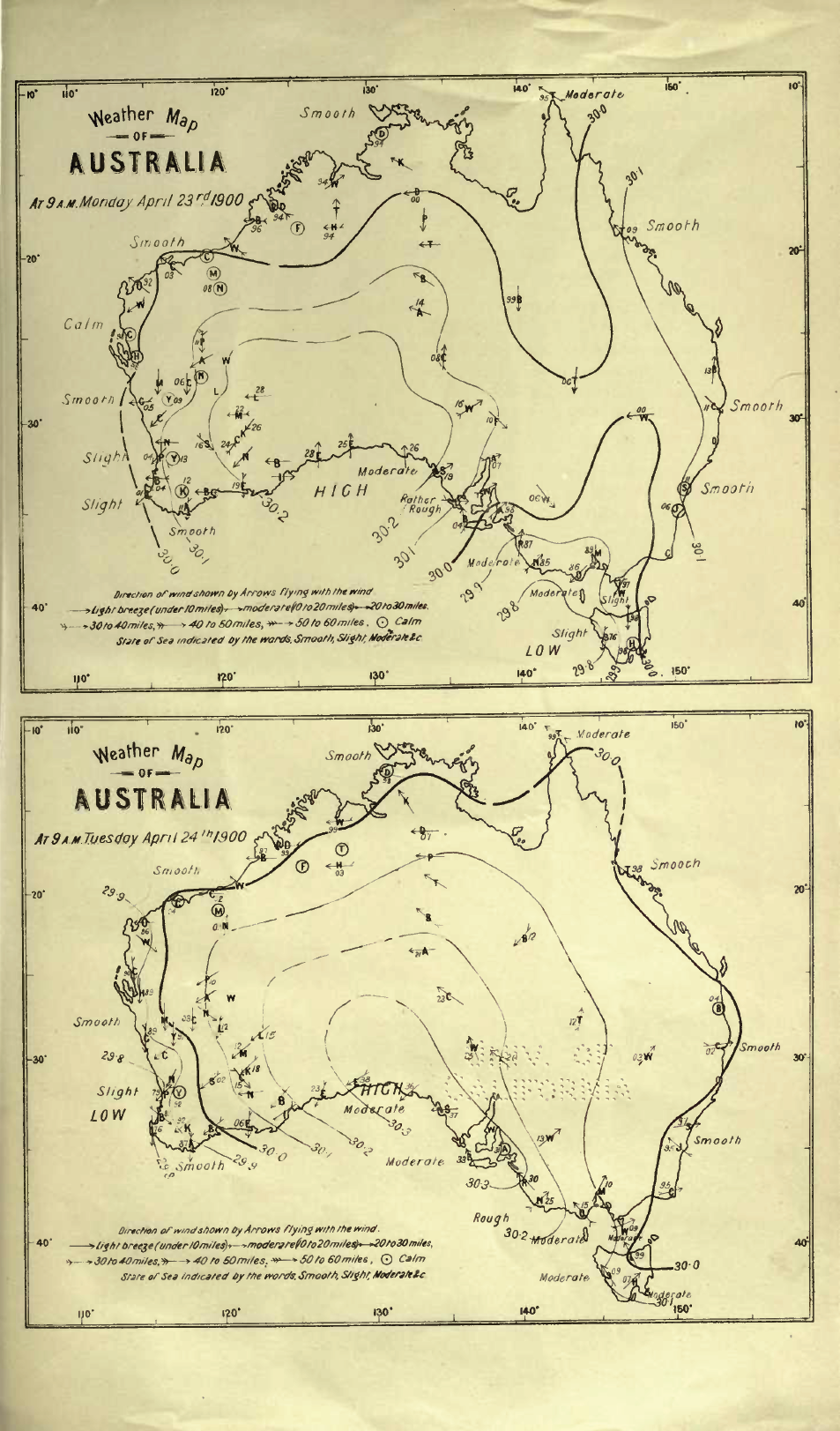
Cooke's Australian weather maps for 23 and 24 April 1900

Cooke opened the Observatory every Tuesday evening to allow public viewings of the equipment.

Cooke developed an interest in the development of low pressure zones which often dominated the weather cycles, and the possibility of tracking these depressions. He studied weather records from the Cape of Good Hope, Natal and Mauritius with the hope of associating weather events there with later events in Australia. He analysed and mapped the passage of cyclones from the North-West into the interior, publishing cyclone forecasts for the first time. In 1908 the meteorology service was taken over by the Commonwealth, enabling him to concentrate on astronomical projects.

He established the first official time service on his arrival in Perth. Using a chronometer and a borrowed theodolite, he determined an accurate solar time each night, clear skies permitting, and a time signal was telegraphed to the GPO at noon each day. In 1897 a small transit telescope replaced the theodolite and in about 1898 two standard German precision clocks were installed to track sidereal time and solar mean time. Several methods of broadcasting the time were used:

- A time ball was dropped at 1 p.m. daily at the Round House at Fremantle
- A time ball was dropped daily at the premises of opticians, 'Frost and Stopham' in Hay Street, Perth
- A public clock controlled by the Observatory mean solar clock was installed at the Observatory front gates
- A parent clock controlled by the mean solar clock was installed at Perth Railway Station, and time signals were telegraphed across the railway network
- Time signals from two clocks at the main telegraph room at the Perth General Post Office were telegraphed to every telegraph station in the state
- A time gun was fired at 1 p.m. at Perth and Fremantle

A six-pound cannon was purchased by the Observatory in November 1902 and used as a time gun.

The Observatory's two main telescopes arrived in 1898–99 but were not fully commissioned until October 1901. In March 1901 Cooke went to Adelaide to carry out observations simultaneously with observers in Perth, to accurately determine longitude.

In about 1901, the International Astrographic Congress asked the observatory to collaborate in the international star cataloguing and charting project, the "International Photo-Durchmusterung" or "Cape Photographic Durchmusterung" (CPD). The invitation was accepted and the Observatory was allotted the 32°-40° South latitudes. It was painstaking work, done over many years, and involved the taking of hundreds of photographic plates, each of two square degrees with some containing twenty thousand stars of magnitude eleven or brighter, and thousands of associated calculations. The project was his major astronomical work and contribution. An astrographic work A Catalogue of 420 Standard Stars was published by the Perth Observatory in 1907. With the catalogue, Cooke produced a critique of the international programme, referring to lack of coordination, refinements that he had made in observation methods and suggested procedures to be used at other sites around the world. As a result, he received wide acclaim from international peers. The Astronomer Royal wrote to the Government astronomer at Adelaide, "to follow implicitly the head of the Perth Observatory and copy their methods ... their catalogues are excellent, and they seem to be able to maintain maximum efficiency with the minimum of energy".

He proposed a plan for coordinated international observations and the preparation of three star catalogues, and that astronomers be requested to confine their major catalogue work to stars in their own meridian. The catalogues proposed were:

A. Bright Stars: This does not form part of the proposed scheme, but of course the regular observation of the principal stars must be continued.
B. Fundamental stars for the general scheme: As a matter of detail I suggest that these be selected of about sixth magnitude and in every region of the sky.
C. Main Catalogue: Comprising say three stars to every square degree, and of course, including the whole of B. This would make a total of over 120,000 stars.

Cooke attended the International Astrographic Conference in Paris in 1909 where he presented his ideas and which were accepted by the congress. He was made one of the 18 members of the Permanent Committee of the Congress.

At the request of the Government of South Australia, he travelled to Adelaide between mid-February and June 1911 where he assisted in determining the South Australian border with Victoria. He then went to the Friendly Islands to observe an eclipse.

In 1912 Cooke departed Western Australia and took a position as government astronomer in New South Wales and Professor of Astronomy at the University of Sydney. He had been given promises of a new observatory and equipment at Wahroonga, but political machinations and economic priorities associated with the First World War meant the project was abandoned and the Sydney Observatory remained as the principal New South Wales facility. The government pushed for its closure in 1926 but was narrowly defeated after a bitter opposition campaign, however Cooke became the political scapegoat and was forced into early retirement in the same year.

Cooke returned to Adelaide in 1936 and died there in 1947.

During his time in Western Australia he was also the government meteorologist until 1908 and the founding chairman of the Civil Service Association in 1902.

== Achievements ==
- His star cataloguing system was accepted at an international astronomical conference in Paris in 1909.
- He developed a method of plotting the transit of tropical cyclones, and issuing weather warnings for shipping and pearling industries
- He invented a type of heliochronometer which could be used to determine local time and true north accurately. The device was known as a sunclock (picture). In 1924 the device won a gold medal at the British Empire Exhibition.
- He recognised that by using radio signals form other parts of the world would enable the accurate measurement of longitude. He worked with his son Basil, a pioneer amateur radio operator, who received time signals from Lyon, France. This technique was used in 1921 by the WA Government Astronomer, Curlewis and the SA Government Astronomer, Dodwell, at Deakin, Western Australia to fix a position for the 129th meridian east longitude (129° east). The same group also travelled to Wyndham, Western Australia to determine the WA/NT border on the ground.
- Was influential in the introduction of probabilistic weather forecasts
- Cooke is said to have patented over one hundred inventions

Satellite 3894 Williamcooke and Mount Cooke in the Darling Scarp near Jarrahdale are named in his honour.

== Partial bibliography ==
- Cooke, W. E. (1901). The Climate of Western Australia, from Meteorological Observations made During the Years 1876–1899. Perth: W.A. Watson, Government printer.
- Cooke, W. E. (1907). A Catalogue of 420 Standard Stars, mostly between 31 & 41 south declination, for the equinox 1905·0. Perth: F.W. Simpson, Government printer.
- Cooke, W.E. (1921). Catalogue of 1068 "Intermediate" Stars situated between 51 and 65 South Declination for the Equinox 1900, from observations made at the Sydney Observatory, New Sound Wales, Australia, during the years 1918–1919. Sydney: W.A. Gullick, Government printer.
