= Geology of South Australia =

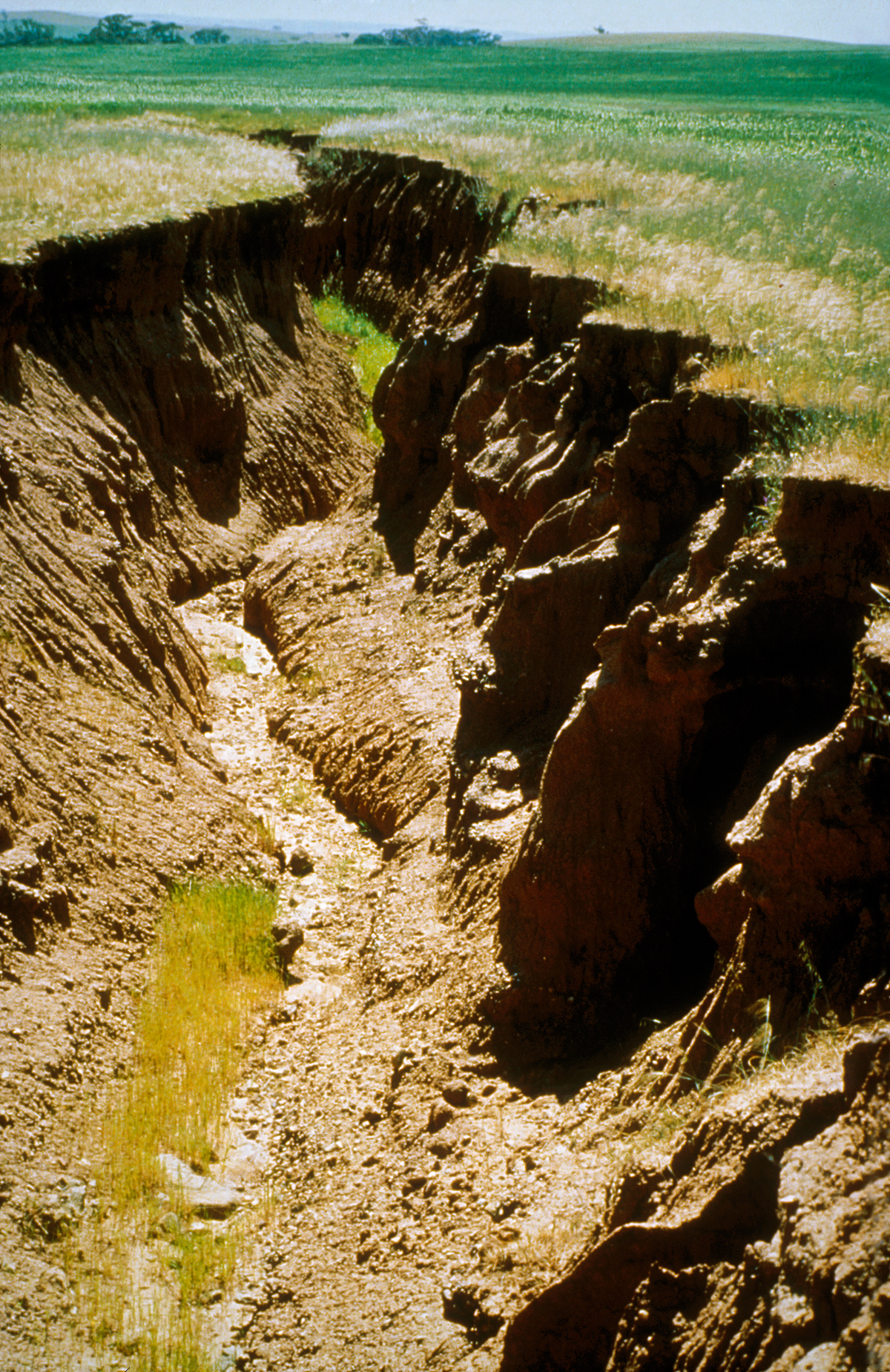
Gully erosion in the Warren Catchment east of Adelaide in the Mount Lofty Ranges 1992

South Australia is an Australian state, situated in the southern central part of the country, and featuring some low-lying mountain ranges, the most significant being the Mount Lofty Ranges, which extend into the state's capital city, Adelaide, which comprises most of the state's population. Adelaide is situated on the eastern shores of Gulf St Vincent, on the Adelaide Plains, north of the Fleurieu Peninsula, between Gulf St Vincent and the low-lying Mount Lofty Ranges. The state of South Australia, which stretches along the coast of the continent and has boundaries with every other state in Australia, with the exception of the Australian Capital Territory and Tasmania. The Western Australia border has a history with South Australia, involving the South Australian Government Astronomer, Dodwell, and the Western Australian Government Astronomer, Curlewis, in the 1920s to mark the border on the ground.

== Background and history of exploration ==
The search for underground water and mineral wealth was the principal stimulus to the growth of geology of South Australia. The state's central position within the Australian continent gives the state the advantage of hosting rocks with a wide range of ages and lithologies which are all potential (and proven) targets for mineral exploration. South Australia featured some of Australia's most recent volcanic activity and is the location of dormant volcanoes, notably Mount Gambier, which last erupted approximately 6,000 years ago.

The geology of South Australia examines the composition and state of its rocks. This includes the processes that act upon the land and its geographical features over time. It may also extend to humanity's relationship with the land, especially its Aboriginal peoples. Certain geological features, such as the extinct volcano Mount Gambier, have strong economic benefits for its local inhabitants, namely the residents of the city Mount Gambier. The economic value of the land has been a point of discussion for industrial development to capitalise on the rich resources, particularly minerals, found within South Australia's geological features. Many of these features remain well preserved and protected, as of 2020.

As South Australia is a large Australian state, spanning over 983,482 km^{2} (379,725 sq mi), with a rich geological history. Its large territories and central position in Australia have resulted in a wide variety of geological features. South Australia has been a major source of mined resources. The state's mining history can be traced back to colonial times, within the first 100 years of settlement. The mining industry in South Australia is dependent on its geology. The South Australian mining industry includes over twenty mines, with large expansions in the 2010s that quadrupled its mineral production. The industry accounts for 40% of the state's exports and has been a major area of investment and expansion by the government and private sector.

== Adelaide Superbasin ==
The Adelaide Superbasin is a series of large, Neoproterozoic to Cambrian aged, sedimentary basins found on the eastern margin of the Gawler Craton, spanning from the Davenport and Denison Ranges, down to Kangaroo Island, and as far east as the Barrier Ranges of New South Wales. It is named after the city of Adelaide. The Adelaide Superbasin initially formed during the breakup of Rodinia with deposition continuing until the Delamerian Orogeny. There are over 140 stratigraphic units within the Adelaide Superbasin. Its formation was influenced by salt tectonics and land deformation. The Flinders Ranges and the Mount Lofty Ranges are found within the Adelaide Superbasin.

The Adelaide Superbasin has been the subject of much research as it contains geological evidence for the breakup of Rodinia, two Snowball Earth events, the transition to mostly eukaryotic life, and the Ediacaran Fauna. The Cambrian successions, especially in the Flinders Ranges, include "the best exposed and most complete lower Cambrian succession of Gondwanaland". These rocks lie over rocks of the Ediacaran, which provides the ability to study the transition from Ediacaran biota to Cambrian life, the so-called "Cambrian explosion". Since the first fossils were discovered on the Yorke Peninsula in 1878, there has been much work done in South Australia in identifying archaeocyath and trilobite fossils of the Cambrian by naturalists, geologists, students, and others. These include Ralph Tate (1840-1901), R.L. Etheridge Junior (1846-1920), Walter Howchin (1845-1937), Edgeworth David (1858-1934), Robert Bedford (1874-1951), Thomas Griffith Taylor (1880-1963), Douglas Mawson (1882–1958), Cecil Madigan (1889-1947), and R. C. Sprigg (1919-1994).

As of 2008, the most significant commodity extracted from the Adelaide Superbasin was copper, with the historic Burra copper mine producing ~2.7 million tonnes of copper ore during its lifetime (1848–1877 and 1970–1981). It is prospective for, and has historically been mined for gold, silver, zinc, cobalt, molybdenum, lead, iron, baryte, magnesite, and talc.

== Gawler Craton ==
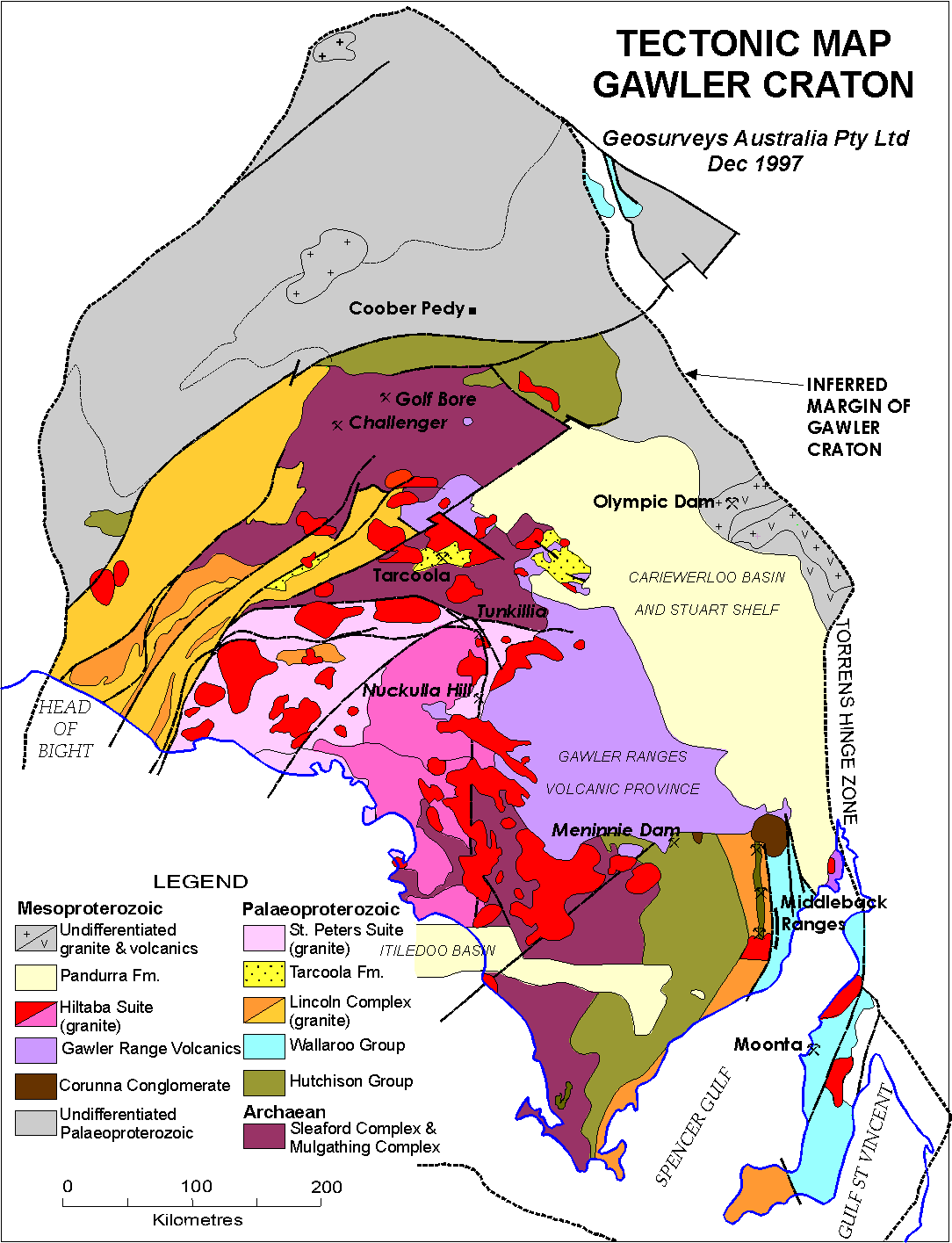
A tectonic map of the Gawler Craton

The Gawler Craton is a large geological province in South Australia, with a size comparable to the United Kingdom. Smaller geological features in the province include the Stuart Range Basin and the Pimba Platform. This Gawler Craton is bounded by the Great Australian Bight to the south and Karari Shear Zone to the north. The separation of land due to such features often separates the types of sedimentary rock found in the Gawler Craton.

The Gawler Craton formed more than three billion years ago in the process of felsic magmatism, the movement of silicate minerals and magma. The area continued to experience these processes, as well as sedimentation, until one and a half billion years ago. The Gawler Craton is resource rich, having an abundance of meta-sedimentary rock. Due to its extent and age, the Gawler Craton is also a source for many precious metals and gems. These include jades, diamonds, copper, gold, iron, zinc, lead, cobalt and nickel. As this location has large resources of valuable ore deposits, mining in this area has been lucrative, being estimated at $35 billion. However, due to South Australia's expansive territories, mining in locations such as the Gawler Craton is often remote. As a result, there have been multiple proposals to expand transport infrastructure in South Australia to alleviate such issues. The most common proposals include railways connecting mines and small towns, with the purpose of catalysing economic prosperity in the state.

== Lake Eyre Basin ==
=== Description ===
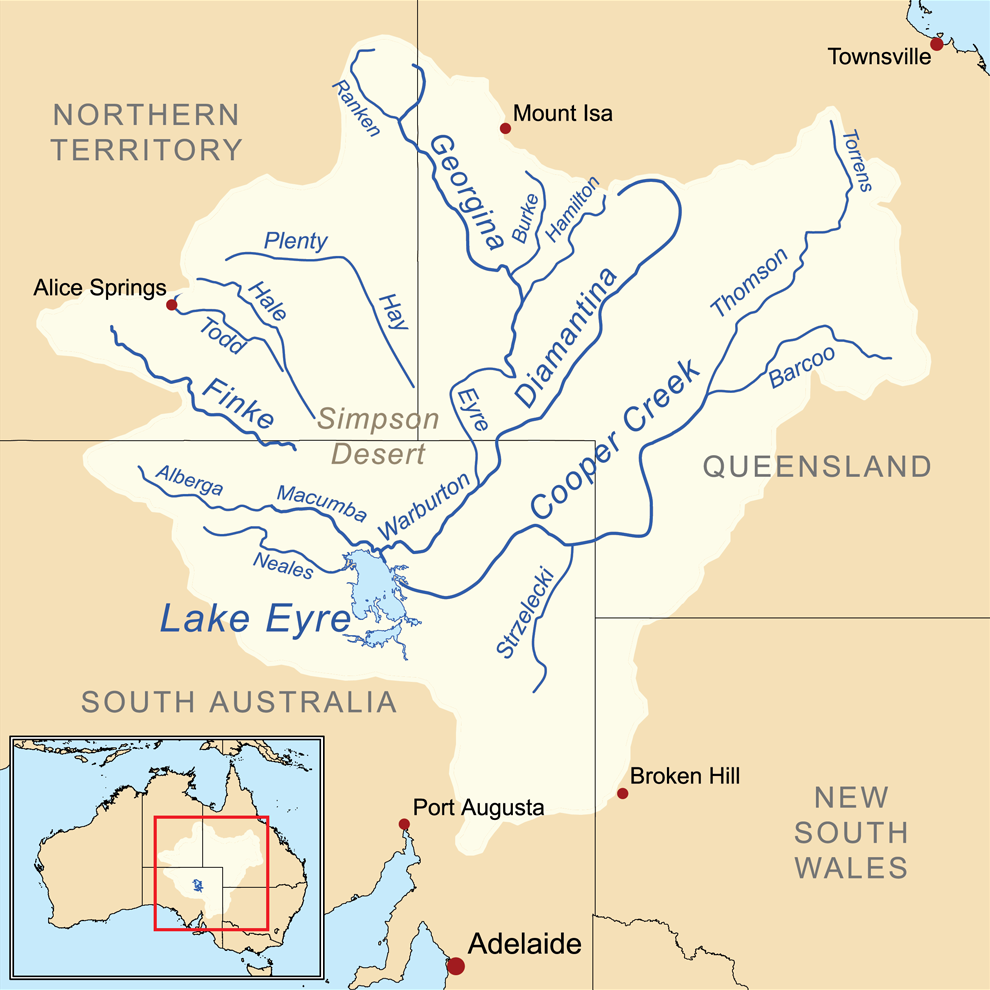
A map of the Lake Eyre Basin

The Lake Eyre Basin is the largest endorheic basin in Australia and is over 1.14 million square kilometres. The basin lies in the north east of the state of South Australia. Its South Australian territory is predominantly semi-arid to arid land. As an endorheic basin, it has no outflows to other bodies of water such as oceans or rivers. As a result, the main causes of water loss are evaporation and seepage. The Lake Eyre Basin consists of seven drainage catchments, with the Georgina Diamantina, Cooper Creek and Neales Peake catchments located fully or partially in South Australia.

Rainfall is one of the most influential climatic processes that acts upon the Lake Eyre Basin. The Lake Eyre Basin receives more rainfall during the summer season due to the high-pressure ridge of the Handley Cell. Likewise, the basin receives less rainfall during winter. Statistics from the Australian Bureau of Meteorology show that rainfall in winter totalled 8mm whilst in summer it was 38mm. This is more profound in Lake Eyre and the basin's South Australian territories, with an average annual rainfall of roughly 125mm, yet its average evaporation can reach over 3600mm. Consequently, this is the cause of the semi-arid and arid terrain found throughout South Australian Lake Eyre territories.

The Lake Eyre Basin consists predominantly of Mesozoic and Cenozoic rocks, which refers to the date of the rocks' formation, from 248 million years ago to the present day. Additionally, there is also a presence of tertiary and quaternary sediments in surface layers of the Lake Eyre Basin. The basin was formed due to land subsidence over 200 million years ago. Sea-level fluctuations caused the basin to be inundated over 100 million years ago, with the ocean receding from the basin 25 million years ago. Lake Eyre Basin gained its endorheic status roughly one million years ago as the salt lakes within its area began blocking water outflows to rivers.

=== Historical Importance ===
The Lake Eyre Basin is also significant in Aboriginal history and culture. The Aboriginal name for the basin is Kati Thanda. This was incorporated into the European name Lake Eyre in 2012 to Kati Thanda-Lake Eyre. The South Australian catchment areas are part of the land called Kirrenderri and inhabited by the Mithaka people for nearly 50 000 years. The Aboriginal area called Wahlduru includes Cooper Creek, the Diamantina River and the Georgina Rivers. The Mithaka people have preserved the land, having strong ties between land and culture.

== Mount Gambier ==
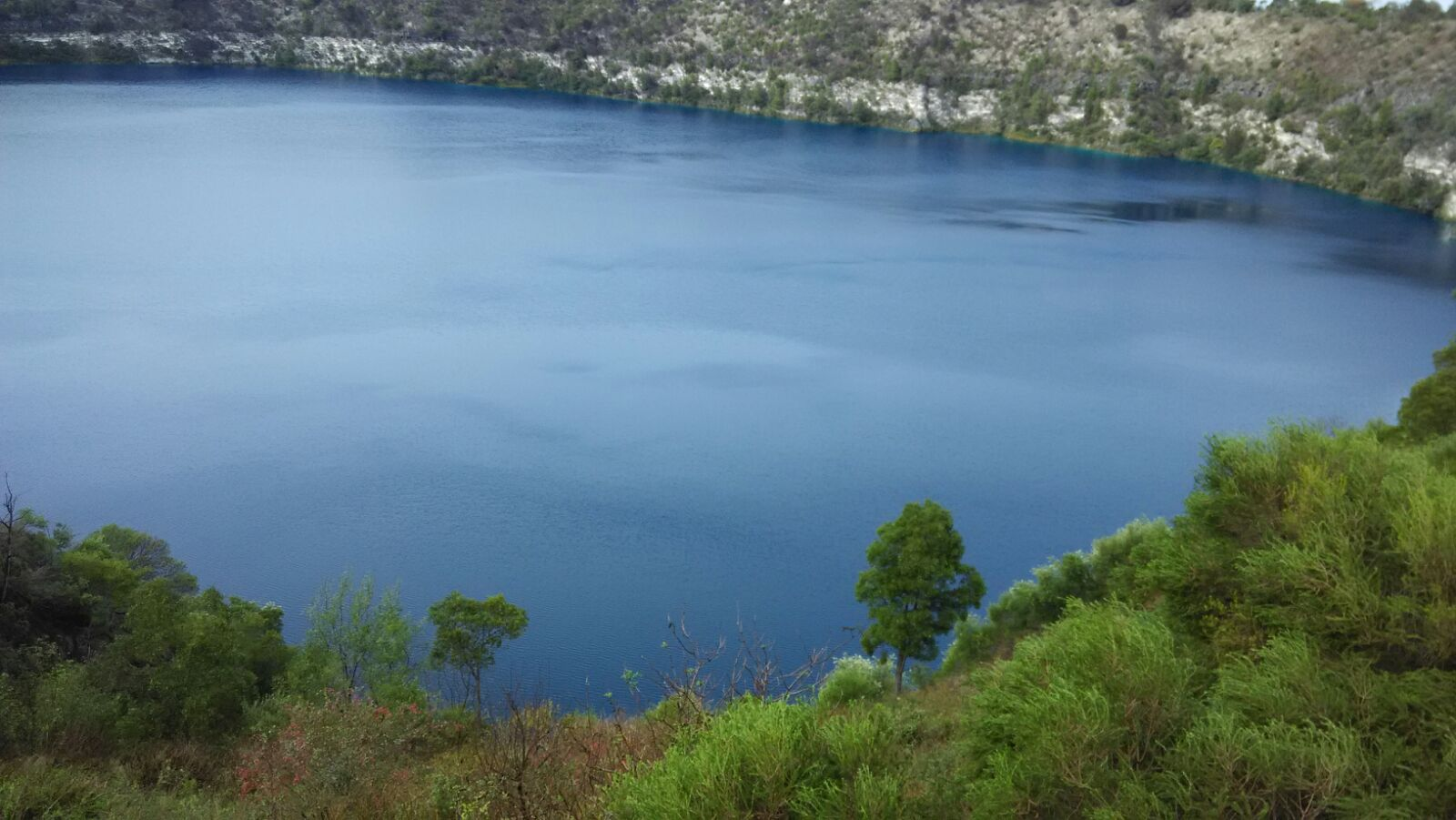
Blue Lake, Mount Gambier

Mount Gambier is roughly 480 kilometres south east of Adelaide and is close to the city also named Mount Gambier. The Mount Gambier Volcanic Complex is a state heritage area that consists of four crater lakes which are: Blue Lake, Valley Lake, Leg of Mutton Lake and Browne's Lake. It is a volcanic complex that has become dormant, with its last eruption a minimum of 4 300 years ago. This phreatic eruption formed the craters of Blue Lake and Valley Lake and was caused by the mixing of groundwater and magma that were in close proximity. It was formed over 5 000 years ago, making it the youngest group of volcanoes in Australia. This is a rough estimate of the volcanoes' age, as the dating of this area is from a range of samples and methods. These samples are also often from swamp deposits that are younger than the volcanoes themselves.

The volcano Mount Gambier is just one of many geological formations that form the Mount Gambier Volcanic Complex. These include Mount Schank, Mount Napier, Mount Eccles (Budj Bim), Tower Hill, Mount Pordon, and Mount Rouse, which range from being three million years old to five thousand years old. The Mount Gambier Volcanic Complex is a state heritage area. The volcanic complex has maar craters and steam vents which were a result of shallow waters being heated by past volcanic activities. The water that lies in Blue Lake / Warwar, Valley Lake, Leg of Mutton Lake, and Browne's Lake used to be a water table, the upper levels of underground water, that was brought to the surface by volcanic activity.

The city of Mount Gambier has strong ties to the volcano Mount Gambier. The city is the second most populous city in South Australia and is a tourist destination due to its nearby geological features. These sites are well-preserved and unique, such as Lake Blue shifting colours depending on the time of year. The Mount Gambier Region is inhabited by the Bungandidj people. They have been the Indigenous custodians of the land for over 30 000 years.

== Geomorphology ==
=== Mount Lofty Ranges ===
The Mount Lofty Ranges is situated on a north–south plane and lies east of the city of Adelaide. The Mount Lofty Ranges is surrounded by the western Murray Basin and the city of Adelaide. The region is roughly 300 square kilometres in length and 1,640 square kilometres with an elevation peaking at 936 metres. The Mount Lofty Ranges are estimated to have been formed over 70 million years ago during the late Cretaceous period or the early Tertiary period. Initial formations of the region occurred in the Cambrian era, over 485 million years ago. The movement of tectonic plates in the region caused a subsidence which formed many basins of low amplitude.

Sedimentary rock found in the basin originate from over 14 million years ago, ceasing after this time. The area contains fan-glomerates as a result of fluctuating climatic conditions involving periods of high rainfall and steam discharge alongside calm weather. The region contains coarse ridges as a result of constant erosion. The Mount Lofty Ranges contain sharp slopes, generated due to an uplift in the earth's surface of over 500m along its western segments.

== See also ==
- Geology of Australia
