= Western Australian Government Astronomer =

Western Australian Government Astronomer is a position created by the Government of Western Australia in 1896.

The first Western Australian Government Astronomer was William Ernest Cooke, who was appointed in 1896. The Perth Observatory became the base for the Western Australia Government Astronomer on completion of the new building in October 1897.

On arrival in Perth, his first task was to determine the exact latitude and longitude of the colony. He was also able to determine the time of day with greater accuracy. Before his arrival clocks could vary by up to half an hour.

The title of 'Government Astronomer' was replaced with the title 'Director' by the WA Government when Mr. M.D. P Candy became the first Director of the Perth Observatory. The title of Government Astronomer was no longer used as being the head of the Perth Observatory.

As of 14 March 2013, the Government Astronomer position ceased to exist at the Perth Observatory.

== History ==
The idea of an observatory for Perth was first introduced by Premier John Forrest in 1891, but failed to obtain financial backing. Funding was finally approved in 1895, along with funds to build the Perth Mint) as well as the Western Australian Museum and Art Gallery.

Forrest asked the Government Astronomer of South Australia, Sir Charles Todd for advice on an observatory. Todd sent specifications for instruments and plans for buildings, based on the Adelaide Observatory and recommended his own Assistant Astronomer, Mr. W.E. Cooke, for the position of Government Astronomer and Meteorologist.

Cooke came to Western Australia to take up his post as the first Government Astronomer for the State in February 1896. The Observatory would not be completed until 1897.

== Western Australia Government Astronomers ==
- 1896–1912 – William Ernest Cooke – Government Astronomer
- 1912–1920 – Harold Burnam Curlewis – Acting Government Astronomer
- 1920–1940 – Harold Burnam Curlewis – Government Astronomer
- 1940–1962 – Hyman Solomon Spigl – Government Astronomer
- 1962–1974 – Bertrand John Harris – Government Astronomer
- 1974–1979 – Dr. Iwan (Ivan) Nikoloff – Acting Government Astronomer
- 1979–1984 – Dr. Iwan (Ivan) Nikoloff – Government Astronomer
- 1984–1993 – Mr. Michael Phillip Candy – Director
- 1994–2010 – Dr. James D. Biggs – Director
- 2010–2013 – Dr. Ralph Martin – Acting Director

== See also ==
- Perth Observatory
- Marking the Western Australia border on the ground
