= (9928) 1981 WE9 =

Asteroid

(9928) 1981 WE_{9}
Discovery
- Discovered by: Perth Obs.
- Discovery site: Perth Obs.
- Discovery date: 16 November 1981

Designations
- Alternative designations: 1971 TJ_{1} · 1993 FC_{43}
- Minor planet category: main-belt · Flora

Orbital characteristics
- Epoch 4 September 2017 (JD 2458000.5)
- Uncertainty parameter 0
- Observation arc: 65.74 yr (24,012 days)
- Aphelion: 2.6101 AU
- Perihelion: 1.8246 AU
- Semi-major axis: 2.2174 AU
- Eccentricity: 0.1771
- Orbital period (sidereal): 3.30 yr (1,206 days)
- Mean anomaly: 340.29°
- Mean motion: 0° 17^{m} 54.6^{s} / day
- Inclination: 2.8472°
- Longitude of ascending node: 179.45°
- Argument of perihelion: 176.04°

Physical characteristics
- Dimensions: 2.441±0.327 km 2.938±0.660 km 3.00±0.42 km 3.11 km (calculated)
- Synodic rotation period: 5.547±0.005 h 18.310±0.0034 h 18.3980±0.0034 h
- Geometric albedo: 0.24 (assumed); 0.283±0.152; 0.3557±0.2289; 0.428±0.109
- Spectral type: S
- Absolute magnitude (H): 14.4 · 14.60 · 14.7

(9928) 1981 WE_{9} is a stony Florian asteroid from the inner regions of the asteroid belt, approximately 3 kilometers in diameter. It was discovered on 16 November 1981, by astronomers at Perth Observatory in Bickley, Australia.

== Orbit and classification ==
Orbit of 1981 WE_{9} (blue), with the inner planets and Jupiter

The stony S-type asteroid is a member of the Flora family, one of the largest groups of asteroids in the main-belt. It orbits the Sun at a distance of 1.8–2.6 AU once every 3 years and 4 months (1,206 days).

Its orbit has an eccentricity of 0.18 and an inclination of 3° with respect to the ecliptic. A first precovery was taken at Palomar in 1951, extending the body's observation arc by 30 years prior to its official discovery observation at Bickley.

== Physical characteristics ==
In December 2014, astronomer Maurice Clark obtained a rotational lightcurve from photometric observations at Preston Gott Observatory. Lightcurve analysis gave an ambiguous rotation period of 18.3980 hours with a brightness variation of 0.41 magnitude, suggesting a non-spheroidal shape (U=2+). The alternative period solution is 9.14 hours with an amplitude of 0.32 magnitude. The results supersede a previously obtained period of 5.547 hours (U=2).

=== Diameter and albedo ===
According to the survey carried out by NASA's Wide-field Infrared Survey Explorer with its subsequent NEOWISE mission, the asteroid measures between 2.44 and 3.00 kilometers in diameter, and its surface has an albedo between 0.283 and 0.428. The Collaborative Asteroid Lightcurve Link assumes an intermediate albedo of 0.24 – derived from 8 Flora, the largest member and namesake of this asteroid family – and calculates a diameter of 3.11 kilometers with an absolute magnitude of 14.7.

== Numbering and naming ==
This minor planet was numbered by the Minor Planet Center on 2 February 1999. As of 2018, it has not been named.
