= Kattamordo Heritage Trail =

Walking trail in Western Australia

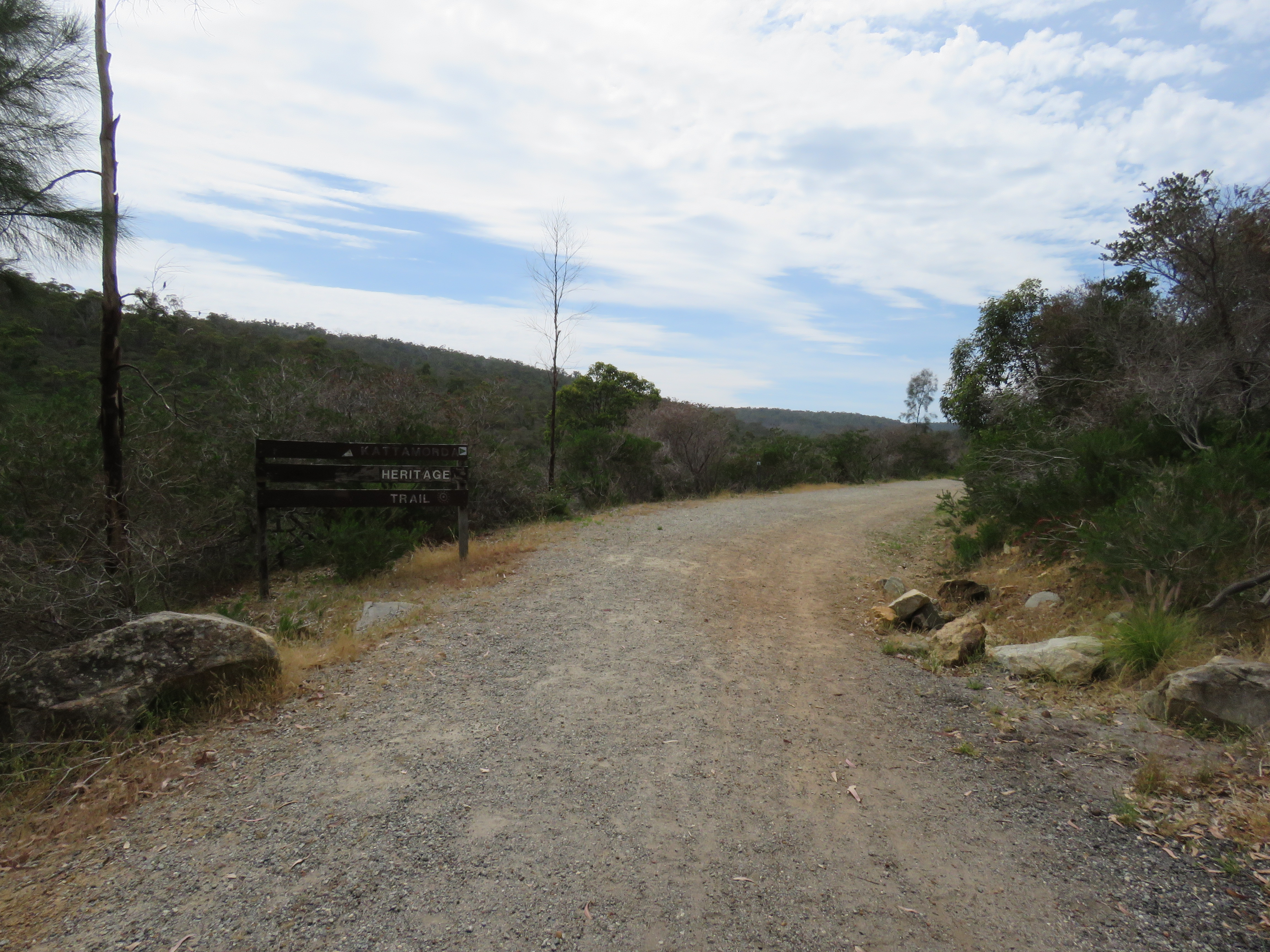
- Southern end of the trail near the Bickley Pumpback Dam
- Length: 27 km (17 mi)
- Location: Shire of Mundaring and the City of Kalamunda
- Completed: 1988
- Designation: Walk Trail
- Trailheads: Mundaring (northern terminus), Bickley Reservoir (southern terminus)
- Use: Walking
- Difficulty: Class 3
- Season: All year, but spring is best
- Waymark: Equilateral Triangle
- Hazards: Summer heat, Fire danger
- Right of way: Pedestrian
- Maintained by: Parks and Wildlife Service, Department of Biodiversity, Conservation and Attractions, Government of Western Australia; Friends of Kattamorda Heritage Trail
- Website: www.kattamorda.org

Trail map
- The Kattamordo Heritage Trail, shown in red, is a walk trail between Mundaring Weir Road and Bickley Reservoir. Also shown, in yellow, is the Kep Track.

Kattamordo Heritage Trail is a walk track in the Shire of Mundaring and the City of Kalamunda in the Darling Range.

== Route ==
It goes for 27 km (17 mi), and includes traversals along formations of former forestry tramways:

- 1908 – Mundaring weir horse tramway (Note: Otherwise known as the wooden-railed tramway built in 1908 to cart timber from Port, Honey & Cos sawmill at The Dell to the Mundaring Weir Railway line at Mundaring Weir.)
- 1872 – Munday Brook horse tramway

It also passes close to Mount Gunjin and Mundaring Weir Road, and through Kalamunda.

It has end points in Mundaring and at Bickley Brook Reservoir.

== See also ==
- Bibbulmun Track
- Kep Track
