= Mount Gunjin (Western Australia) =

Mountain in Western Australia

Coordinates: 31°59′S 116°08′E

Mount Gunjin (1,308 feet (399 m)) is a point of high ground between Mundaring Weir and Kalamunda, south of the Mundaring Weir Road. It is north of Mount Dale and south west of Mundaring Weir.

It was the location of a Western Australian Forestry Department fire-watching tower, which had a few names including Mount Gunjin lookout tower.

The fire tower and hut site are identified in the Kattamordo Heritage Trail pamphlet as being constructed in 1921.

Prior to the relocation of the Perth Observatory from Mount Eliza to Bickley, a site near Mount Gunjin had been considered for the observatory.

In 1966 Mount Gunjin became the origin point in Western Australia for the National Geodetic Survey.

== See also ==
- Mount Cooke
