= The Warren Centre for Advanced Engineering =

Think tanks based in Australia

The Warren Centre for Advanced Engineering was founded in 1983, marking the centenary of Australia’s first university engineering lecture delivered by William Henry Warren at the University of Sydney in 1883.

== History ==
There were 20 founding members of the Centre, including six professors of the engineering faculty and engineers from various industry backgrounds. The Centre raised an initial $2 million (AUD) endowment from a range of major Australian engineering companies and private donors. The Centre's stated founding aim was to "foster engineering excellence around Australia to create wealth."

Over the following 30 years, The Warren Centre has implemented several programs related to Australian engineering, including Winning By Design, Fire Safety & Engineering, Underground Space, Sustainable Transport in Sustainable Cities, and Low Energy High Rise, which aimed to encourage the industry to consider the broader consequences of engineering processes.

Since 1996, The Warren Centre has been hosting an annual Innovation Lecture presented by an Australian scientist or engineer. The speaker comments on their achievements, with past guests discussing topics such as Cochlear Ltd., Google Maps, Maptek and the Virgin Galactic space program.

The Warren Centre was an ASIC-registered controlled entity until 2020, after which it was transitioned back to the University of Sydney Faculty of Engineering.

The Warren Centre used to fund a Chair in Engineering Innovation at the University of Sydney. Professor Andy Dong held this position in 2012 but has since moved to Oregon State University, and the Chair role was since discontinued.

== Current work ==
Current projects at the Warren Centre include off-grid power solutions such as small modular nuclear reactors, construction performance, quality and waste reduction, and urban reform.

The Warren Centre’s STEM education work is focused on influencing federal and state governments to change education within Australia's STEM fields. It also includes working with undergraduate and graduate students at Australian universities to commercialize innovative projects, such as the parcel delivery drone service.

In its public policy work, the Warren Centre is an advocate of engineering leadership and commercialization, as well as supporting redesigns in public transport and urban structures, with a specific focus on renewable energy.

== Innovation lectures ==
The Warren Centre's annual Innovation Lecture program has been running since 1996 with the first presenter, John Bertrand, and with other speakers including BHP's Jerry Ellis, Cochlear's Catherine Livingstone, Aimtek's Don Fry, Google's Dr. Lars Rasmussen, professor Hugh F. Durrant-Whyte, Maptek's Dr Bob Johnson, Australian Chief Defence Scientist Dr. Alex Zelinsky, and Virgin Galactic's The Spaceship Company Director of Operations Enrico Palermo. The 2026 Innovation Lecture was delivered by Cathy Foley

== Advisory Board of Directors ==
- Mr Chris Vonwiller (Chair)
- Professor Hesham El Gamal (Ex-Officio Director)
- Mr Chris Janssen, GPC Electronics Pty Ltd
- Dr John Lear, JBL Consulting
- Ms Fiona Mahony, Telstra
