= William Henry Warren =

Australian engineer

- Born: 2 February 1852; Bristol, Somerset, England
- Died: 9 January 1926 (aged 73); Sydney
- Resting place: Waverley Cemetery
- Other names: W. H. Warren

William Henry Warren (2 February 1852 – 9 January 1926) was an Australian engineer and twice president of the Royal Society of New South Wales. Australian engineering think-tank The Warren Centre for Advanced Engineering and the annual W H Warren Medal were established in his honour.

== Early life ==
Warren was born in Bristol, Somerset, England, son of William Henry Warren, railway guard, and his wife Catherine Ann, née Abrahams. Warren was educated at the Royal College of Science, Dublin, and Queen's College, Manchester.

== Career in Australia ==
In 1890, he was made Challis Professor with salary of £900.

He was inaugural president of the Institution of Engineers of Australia, an Australian representative of the Institution of Civil Engineers in Great Britain, and a council member of the International Society for the Testing of Materials. During World War I, Warren conducted over 10,000 tests of munition steel.

== Later life ==
He died at Sydney on 9 January 1926 and was buried in the Anglican section of Waverley Cemetery. Warren was survived by two sons.

== Personal life ==
Warren married Albertine King with Church of England rites on 27 July 1875 at St Pancras, London. They had two sons before emigrating to Australia. She was born on 30 January 1852 in Camden Town, Middlesex, and baptised on 25 July 1852 at St. Pancras. She was employed variously as a barmaid, pianist and a teacher of music. Albertine Warren died on 12 June 1935 in Portsmouth, Hampshire, at 83 years of age.

Herbert Henry Warren was the second son of the marriage, was born in 1880 in Birmingham, Warwickshire. It is unknown where he was educated but he became a medical student and was living in Portsmouth, Hampshire, in 1911.

Ernest William Warren (1875–1944) was the first son of the marriage, was born in October 1875 in Chorlton-upon-Medlock, Lancashire, and was baptised on 5 December 1875 at St Savior's Church in the same town. After arriving in Australia, and whilst living at Madeley in London Street, Enmore, Ernest Warren was enrolled as a Day Boy at Newington College. The admission register shows him as being 8 years of age on 25 January 1884 and beginning in Form L 1. He had a distinguished academic career at Newington and in 1893 he won the Wigram Allen Scholarship, awarded by Sir George Wigram Allen, for general proficiency, with Harold Curlewis receiving it for classics. At the end of 1892 Warren had been named Dux of the College and received the Schofield Scholarship. For his pass in the Senior Examination of 1893 he was awarded the Hardy Medal presented by the founder of Hardy Brothers, John Hardy. He went to the University of Sydney in 1894 and graduated as a Bachelor of Engineering (Civil) in 1897, Bachelor of Arts in 1898 and his Bachelor of Laws in 1900. Warren was admitted to the bar in May 1901. At his own request, he was removed from the roll of barristers, and was admitted to practice as a solicitor in 1906. For a decade from the mid-teens until the mid-20s he held the position of lecturer-in-charge of the department of physics at Sydney Technical College and then returned to the law. He practised in law at 179 Elizabeth Street, Sydney, until his death at a private hospital in Ashfield on 29 September 1944. Warren was survived by his wife Ethel and sons Boy and Billy.

Awards
Preceded by Edwin Hall	Schofield Scholarship; Dux of Newington College; Ernest Warren; 1891	Succeeded by Harold Curlewis

== See also ==
- Long Gully Bridge
