= 3953 Perth =

Main-belt asteroid

Discovery
- Discovered by: E. Bowell
- Discovery site: Anderson Mesa Stn.
- Discovery date: 6 November 1986

Designations
- Named after: Perth Observatory (in West Australia)
- Alternative designations: 1986 VB_{6} · 1969 TO_{6} 1979 QG_{8} · 1979 RP_{1}
- Minor planet category: main-belt · (inner); Flora

Orbital characteristics
- Epoch 4 September 2017 (JD 2458000.5)
- Uncertainty parameter 0
- Observation arc: 46.84 yr (17,109 days)
- Aphelion: 2.6876 AU
- Perihelion: 1.8342 AU
- Semi-major axis: 2.2609 AU
- Eccentricity: 0.1887
- Orbital period (sidereal): 3.40 yr (1,242 days)
- Mean anomaly: 46.332°
- Mean motion: 0° 17^{m} 23.64^{s} / day
- Inclination: 4.9507°
- Longitude of ascending node: 129.08°
- Argument of perihelion: 237.98°

Physical characteristics
- Dimensions: 4.18 km (derived); 4.80±0.16 km
- Synodic rotation period: 5.083±0.005 h 5.087±0.0010 h 5.2±0.1 h
- Geometric albedo: 0.24 (assumed); 0.335±0.066
- Spectral type: S
- Absolute magnitude (H): 13.40 · 13.5 · 13.712±0.009 (R) · 13.81±0.23 · 14.06±0.04

3953 Perth, provisional designation 1986 VB_{6}, is a stony Florian asteroid from the inner regions of the asteroid belt, approximately 4.5 kilometers (2.8 mi) in diameter. It was discovered on 6 November 1986, by American astronomer Edward Bowell at the Anderson Mesa Station near Flagstaff, Arizona. The asteroid was named for the Australian Perth Observatory.

== Orbit and classification ==
Perth is a member of the Flora family (402), a giant asteroid family and the largest family of stony asteroids in the main-belt. It orbits the Sun in the inner main-belt at a distance of 1.8–2.7 AU once every 3 years and 5 months (1,242 days). Its orbit has an eccentricity of 0.19 and an inclination of 5° with respect to the ecliptic.

The asteroid was first identified as 1969 TO_{6} at Crimea–Nauchnij in October 1969. The body's observation arc begins at Nauchnij with its identification as 1979 RP_{1} in October 1979, more than seven years prior to its official discovery observation at Anderson Mesa.

== Physical characteristics ==
Perth is an assumed S-type asteroid, which corresponds with the overall spectral type of the Flora family.

=== Rotation period ===
In February 2008, a rotational lightcurve of Perth was obtained by a collaboration of astronomers in a photometric survey of the Flora region. Lightcurve analysis gave a rotation period of 5.083 hours with a brightness variation of 0.28 magnitude (U=2). Other photometric observations at the Palomar Transient Factory in October 2010, and by Wiesław Wiśniewski in December 1993, gave a period of 5.087 and 5.2 hours with an amplitude of 0.92 and 1.09, respectively (U=2/2+).

=== Diameter and albedo ===
According to the survey carried out by the NEOWISE mission of NASA's Wide-field Infrared Survey Explorer, Perth measures 4.80 kilometers in diameter and its surface has an albedo of 0.335, while the Collaborative Asteroid Lightcurve Link assumes an albedo of 0.24 – taken from 8 Flora the Flora family's largest member and namesake – and derives a diameter of 4.18 kilometers based on an absolute magnitude of 14.06.

== Naming ==
This minor planet was named after the Australian Perth Observatory for its many contributions to astronomy including the Perth 70 meridian catalogue, the co-discovery of the rings of Uranus, and observational work on Comet Halley both in 1910 and 1986. The observatory was founded near the city of Perth in 1896, and moved to Bickley in 1965. The observatory is known for its astrometry and photometry on small Solar System bodies. The official naming citation was published by the Minor Planet Center on 17 August 1989 (M.P.C. 14972).
