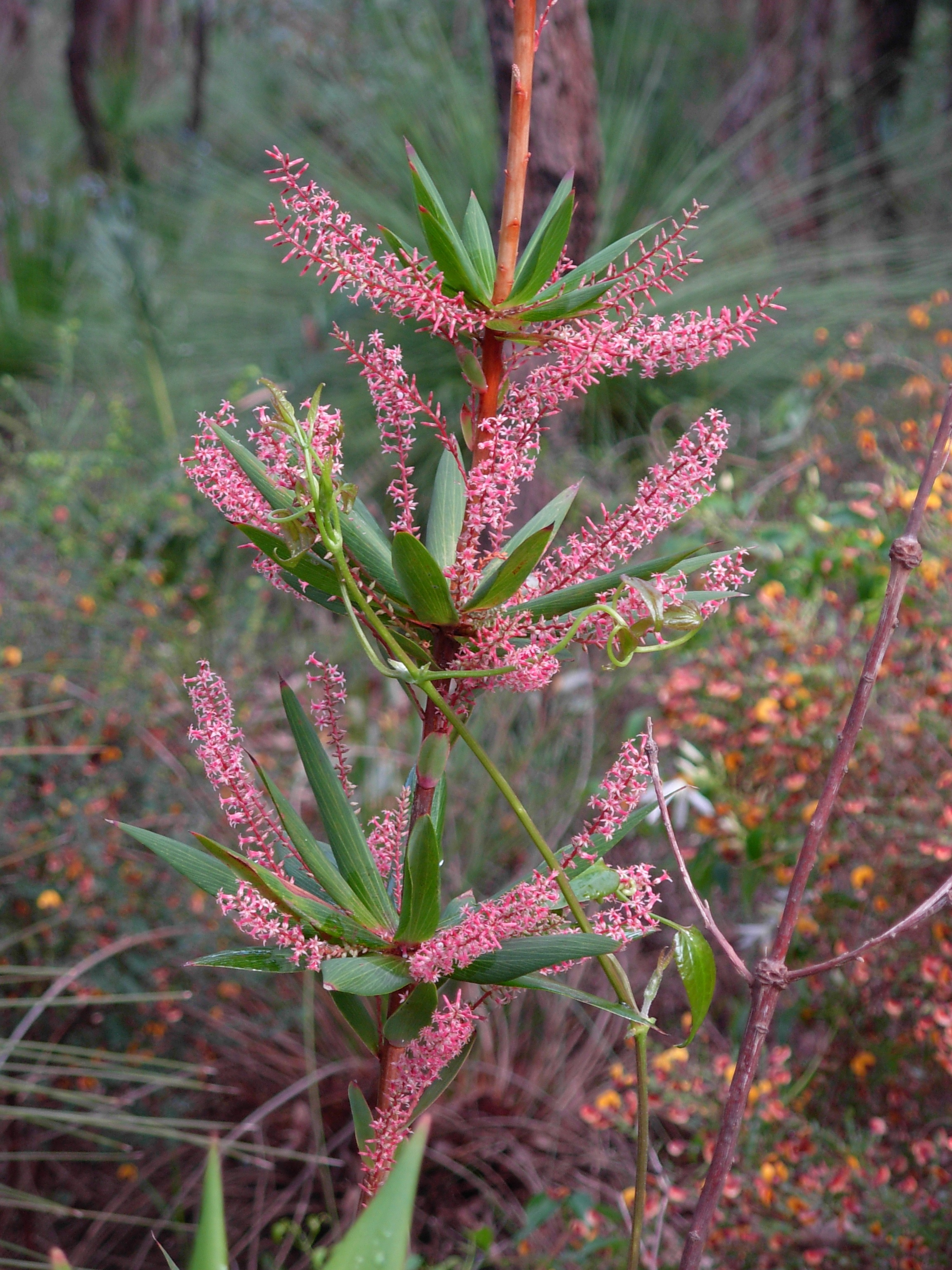
- Leucopogon verticillatus in Beelu National Park

Scientific classification
- Kingdom: Plantae
- Clade: Tracheophytes
- Clade: Angiosperms
- Clade: Eudicots
- Clade: Asterids
- Order: Ericales
- Family: Ericaceae
- Genus: Leucopogon
- Species: L. verticillatus

Binomial name
- Leucopogon verticillatus R.Br.
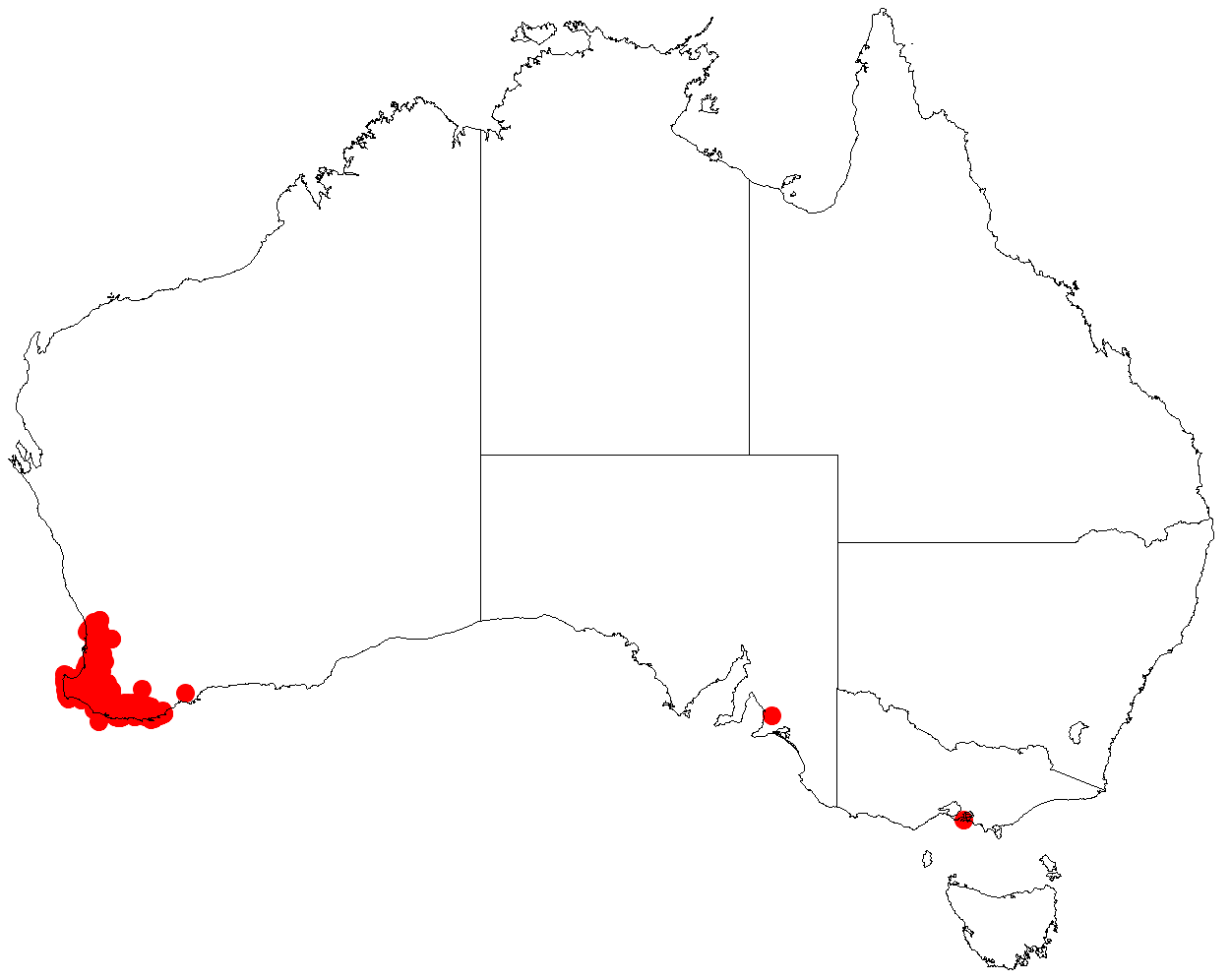
- Occurrence data from AVH

= Leucopogon verticillatus =

Tassel flower

Species of flowering plant

Leucopogon verticillatus, commonly known as tassel flower, is a species of flowering plant in the heath family Ericaceae and is endemic to the southwest of Western Australia. It is an erect, bamboo-like shrub with broadly lance-shaped leaves and pink, tube-shaped flowers crowded along spikes in leaf axils and on the ends of branches.

== Description ==
Leucopogon verticillatus is an erect, glabrous shrub that typically grows up to 1.5 m (4 ft 11 in) high. The leaves are light green, broadly lance-shaped, mostly 50–100 mm (2.0–3.9 in) long, 25 mm (0.98 in) wide and sharply pointed. The leaves are mostly crowded at the ends of each year's growth, so that they appear whorled. The edges of the leaves are turned down and there are fine veins visible on the surface. The flowers are crowded along unbranched spikes up to 60 mm (2.4 in) long in leaf axils and on the ends of branches. The bracts and bracteoles are less than half the length of the sepals. The sepals are about 2 mm (0.079 in) long, and the petals are pink, about 4 mm (0.16 in) long and joined at the base forming a tube with lobes about half the length of the petal tube. Flowering occurs in September and October.

== Taxonomy ==
Leucopogon verticillatus was first formally described in 1810 by Robert Brown in his Prodromus Florae Novae Hollandiae et Insulae Van Diemen. The specific epithet (verticillatus) means "verticillate", referring to the leaves.

== Distribution and habitat ==
This leucopogon often grows in lateritic or gravelly soils in wet places in karri, jarrah, and marri forest between Perth and Waychinicup National Park in the Esperance Plains, Jarrah Forest, Swan Coastal Plain and Warren bioregions of southern Western Australia.

== Conservation status ==
Leucopogon verticillatus is listed as "not threatened" by the Government of Western Australia Department of Biodiversity, Conservation and Attractions.
