= Mount Cooke =

Mountain in Western Australia

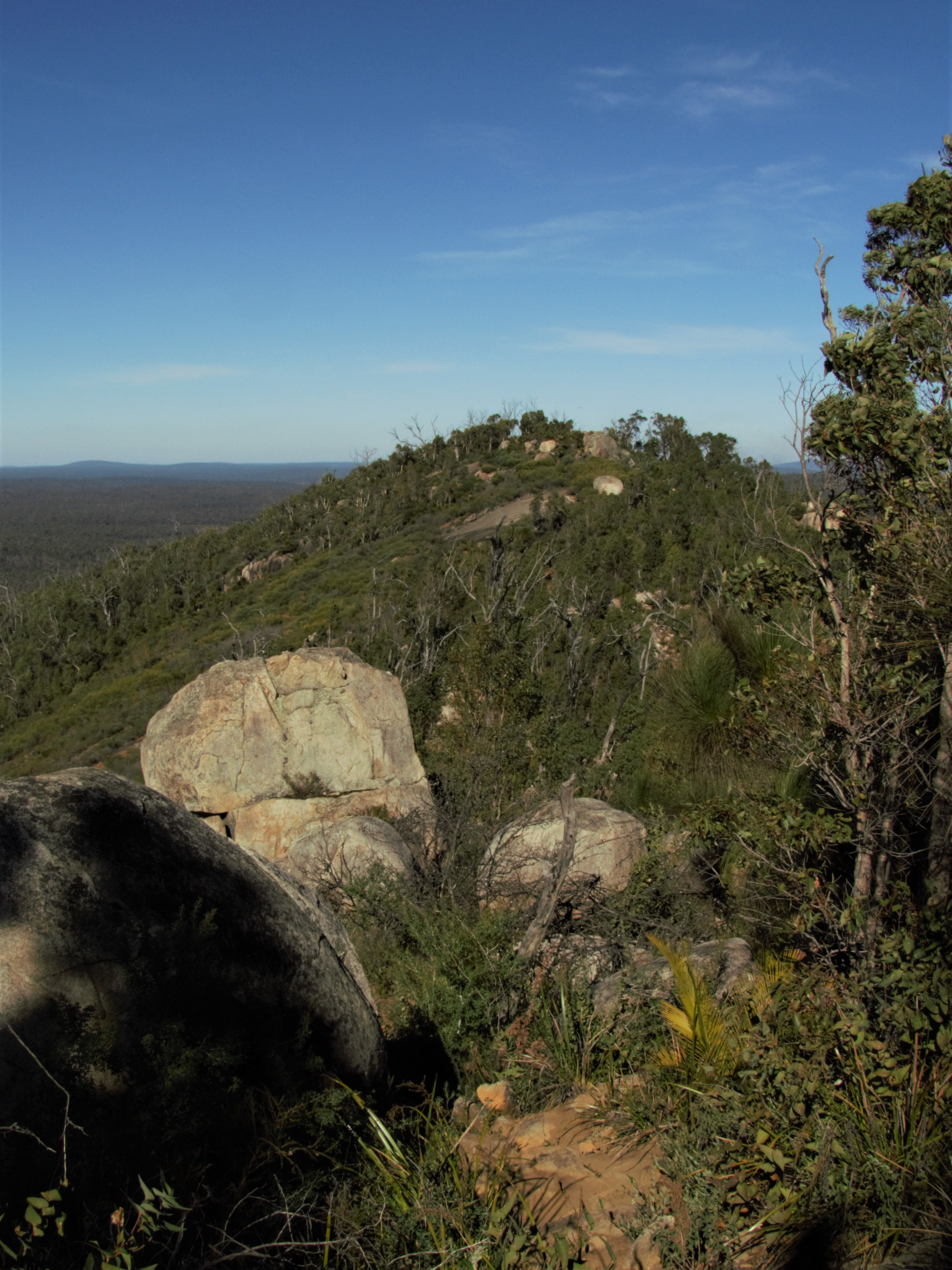
- Mount Cooke

Highest point
- Elevation: 582 m (1,909 ft)
- Prominence: 582 m (1,909 ft)
- Coordinates: 32°25′26″S 116°18′45″E

Geography
- Location within Western Australia
- Location: Western Australia
- Parent range: Darling Range

Mount Cooke, near the Western Australia town of Jarrahdale, is one of the highest points on the Darling Scarp, at 582 metres (1,909 ft). It was named after William Ernest Cooke, Western Australia's first Government Astronomer.

Mount Cooke is well known for its walk track, which is part of the Bibbulmun Track. The Bibbulmun Track leads from a parking and picnic area, and goes thousands of metres through the jarrah forest, coloured with a host of wildflowers in all seasons, to the summit of Mount Cooke.

Mount Cooke is within the Monadnocks Conservation Park and administered by the Department of Environment and Conservation.

== See also ==
- Mount Dale
- Mount Gunjin
