= Mundaring Weir Road =

Road in Perth, Western Australia

Mundaring Weir Road Western Australia
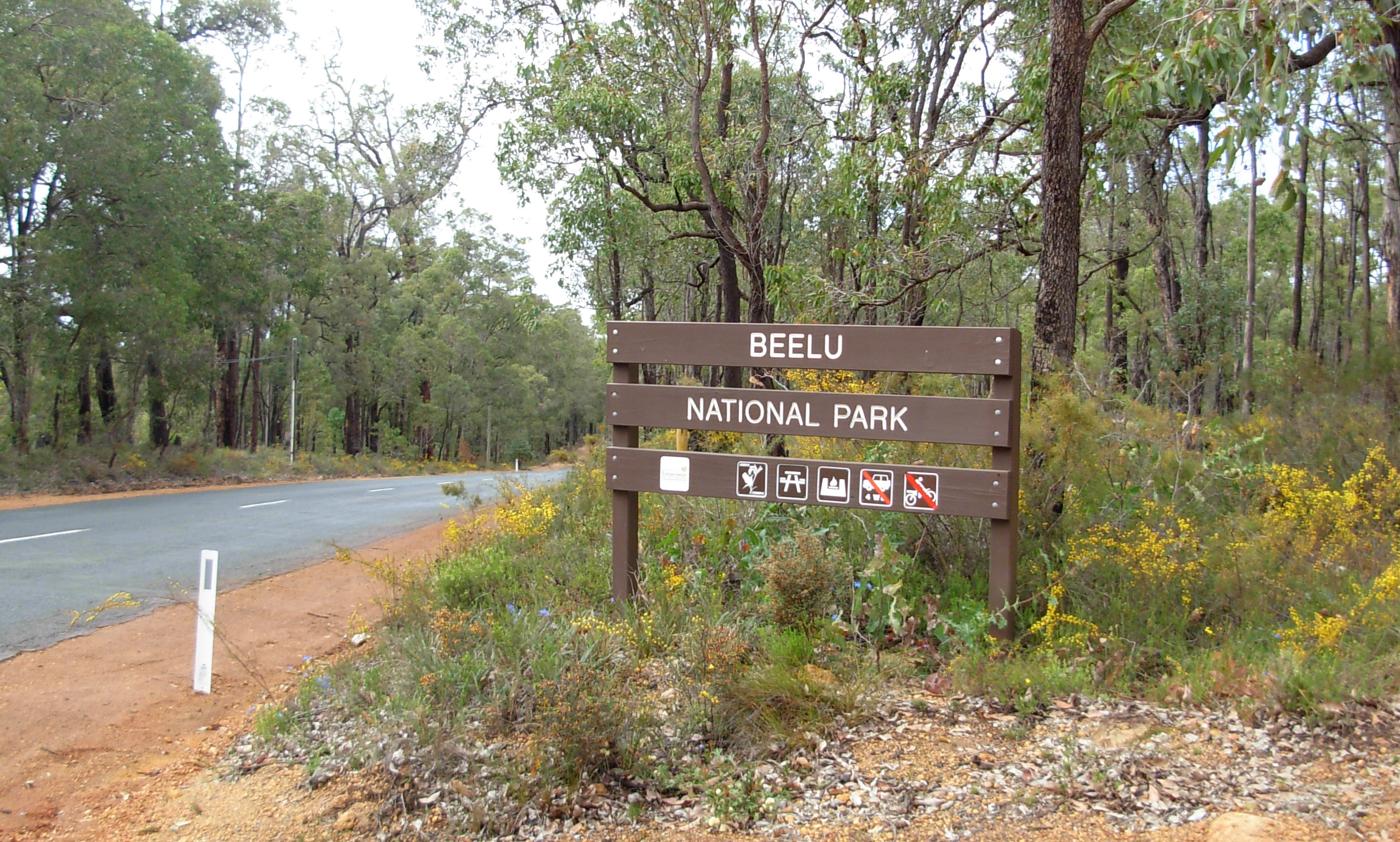
- Mundaring Weir Road at the Beelu National Park

General information
- Type: Road
- Length: 24 km (15 mi)
- Tourist routes: Tourist Drive 207

Major junctions
- Northeast end: Great Eastern Highway (National Highway 94), Mundaring
- Southwest end: Canning Road (State Route 41), Kalamunda

Location(s)
- Major suburbs: Mundaring Weir

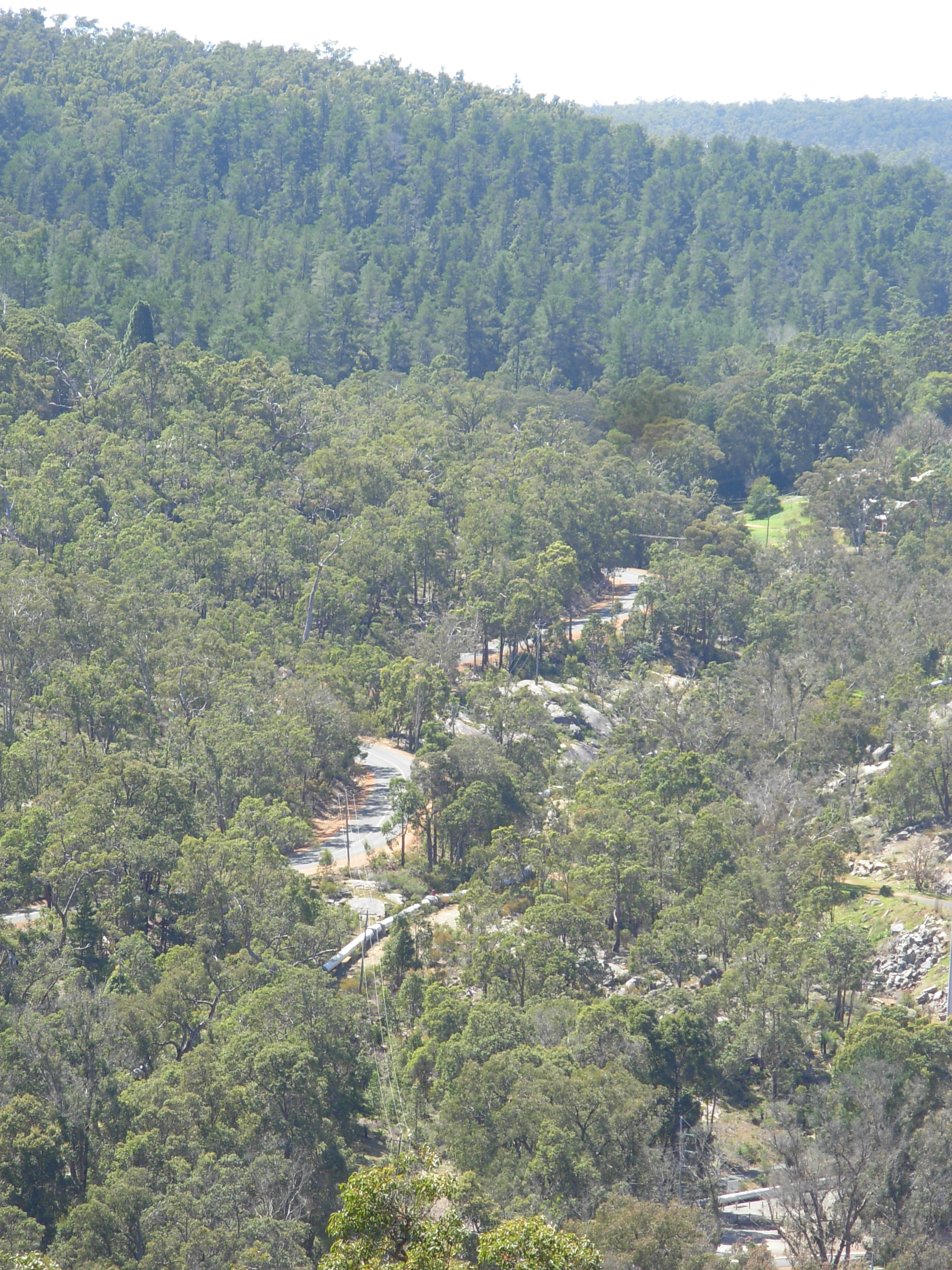
Mundaring Weir Road, just north west of Mundaring Weir.

Mundaring Weir Road (Kalamunda-Mundaring road) is a road in the outer eastern suburbs of Perth, Western Australia that links Mundaring and Kalamunda.

Although an earlier rough track existed in a similar route, the Kalamunda-Mundaring road was developed in the late 1930s.

It is the primary access route for Mundaring Weir, a dam and tourist attraction. It is a single carriageway for its entire length, with one lane in either direction. It crosses the alignment of the long since removed Mundaring Weir Railway a number of times, before crossing the Helena River just west of the first pumping station for the Goldfields Water Supply Scheme.

It passes east of the Beelu National Park, and north of Mount Gunjin.

It starts from Phillips Road in Mundaring, 35 km east of Perth's central business district, and heads south towards the weir from which it derives its name through State Forest regions. It then heads west, providing access to the sparsely populated and largely forested agricultural localities of Hacketts Gully and Paulls Valley, before entering Kalamunda from the east. It terminates at a roundabout in Kalamunda's town centre.

It has been a vital link into forestry areas – and also areas subjected to bushfire in recent years.

The Darling Range Tourist Drive (Tourist Drive 207) follows Mundaring Weir Road as it travels between Mundaring and Kalamunda.

== See also ==
- Mount Dale
