= Beelu National Park =

National park in Western Australia

- IUCN category II (national park)
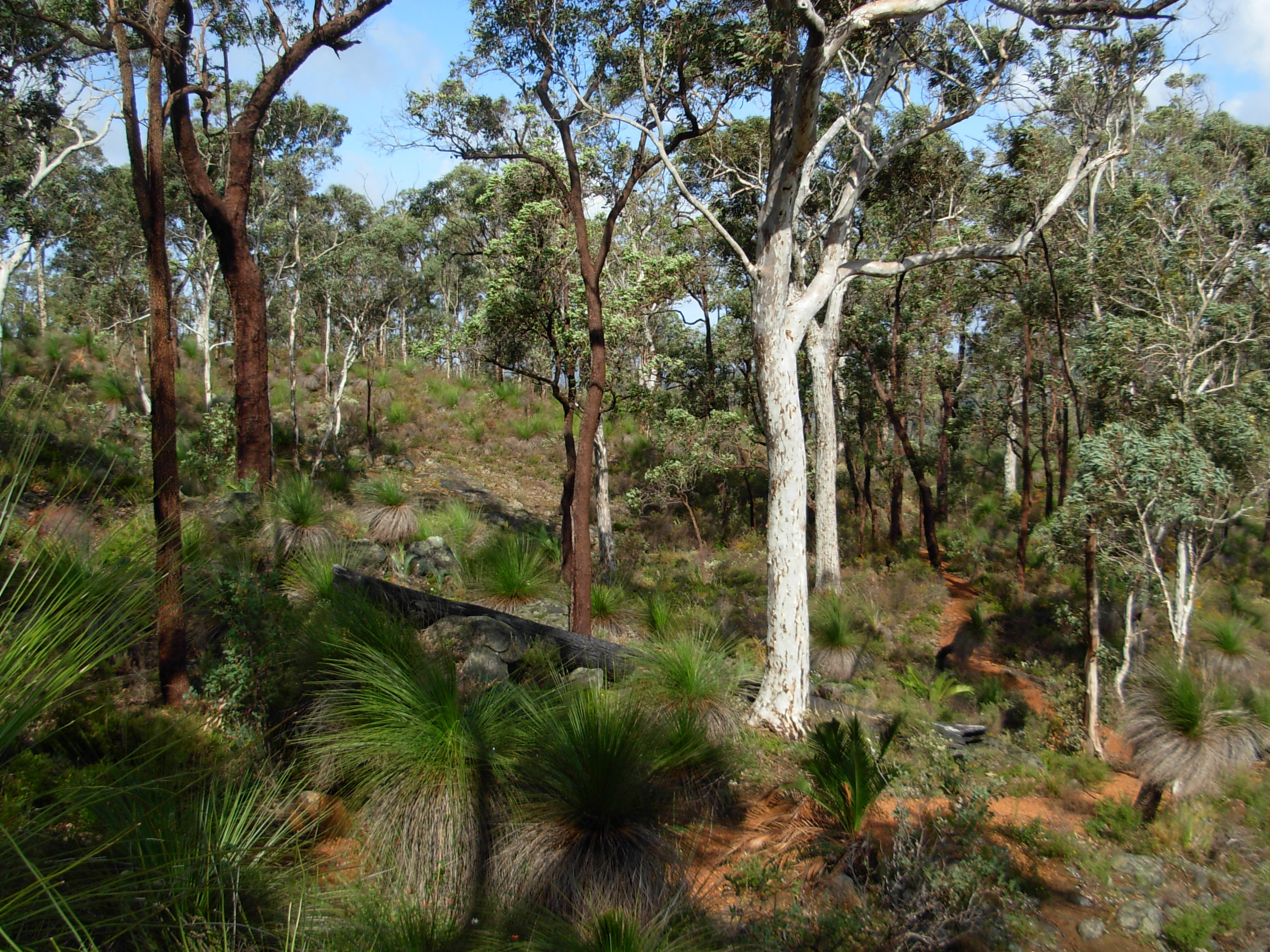
- Helena River valley hillside

- Location within Western Australia
- Location: Western Australia
- Nearest city: Mundaring
- Coordinates: 31°57′16″S 116°08′59″E
- Area: 46.17 km^{2} (17.83 sq mi)
- Established: 1995
- Governing body: Department of Environment and Conservation
- Website: http://parks.dpaw.wa.gov.au/park/beelu

Beelu National Park is a national park east of Perth, Western Australia. Lying south of Mundaring, Western Australia, and west of the Mundaring Weir Road, it is part of the group of parks known as the Parks of the Darling Range. The park was formerly named Mundaring National Park.

Mundaring National Park was established and gazetted in 1995 as part of the Protecting Our Old Growth Forests policy of the state government. The park was renamed in 2008 as an acknowledgement of the traditional owners of the area. The word Beelu is derived from the Noongar word for river or stream. The Beelu were the original people of the area, whose district was bounded by the Helena, Swan and Canning Rivers.

The park contains an abundance of native flora including jarrah, marri, Zamia, bull Banksia, sheoak and grass tree.

== Facilities ==
The park contains toilets, wood barbecues, picnic tables and a variety of hiking and mountain biking trails. An information centre, the Perth Hills National Parks Centre, is located within the park. A lookout is located at South Ledge, with a view over Mundaring Weir and Lake CY O'Connor. The largest oak tree in Western Australia is found in Fred Jacoby Park. Two campsites are available for use within the park.

== See also ==
- Protected areas of Western Australia

== Gallery ==
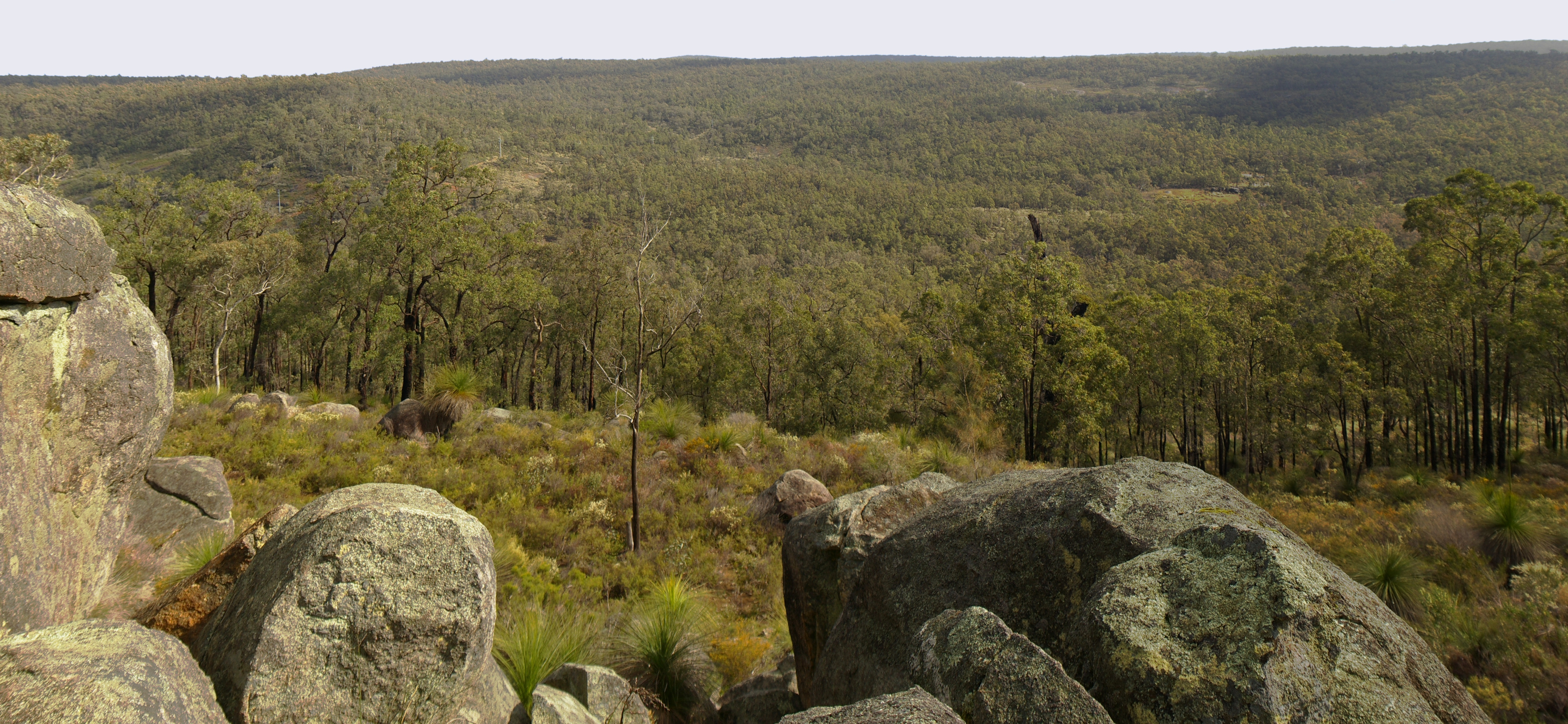
North Ridge across the Helena Valley

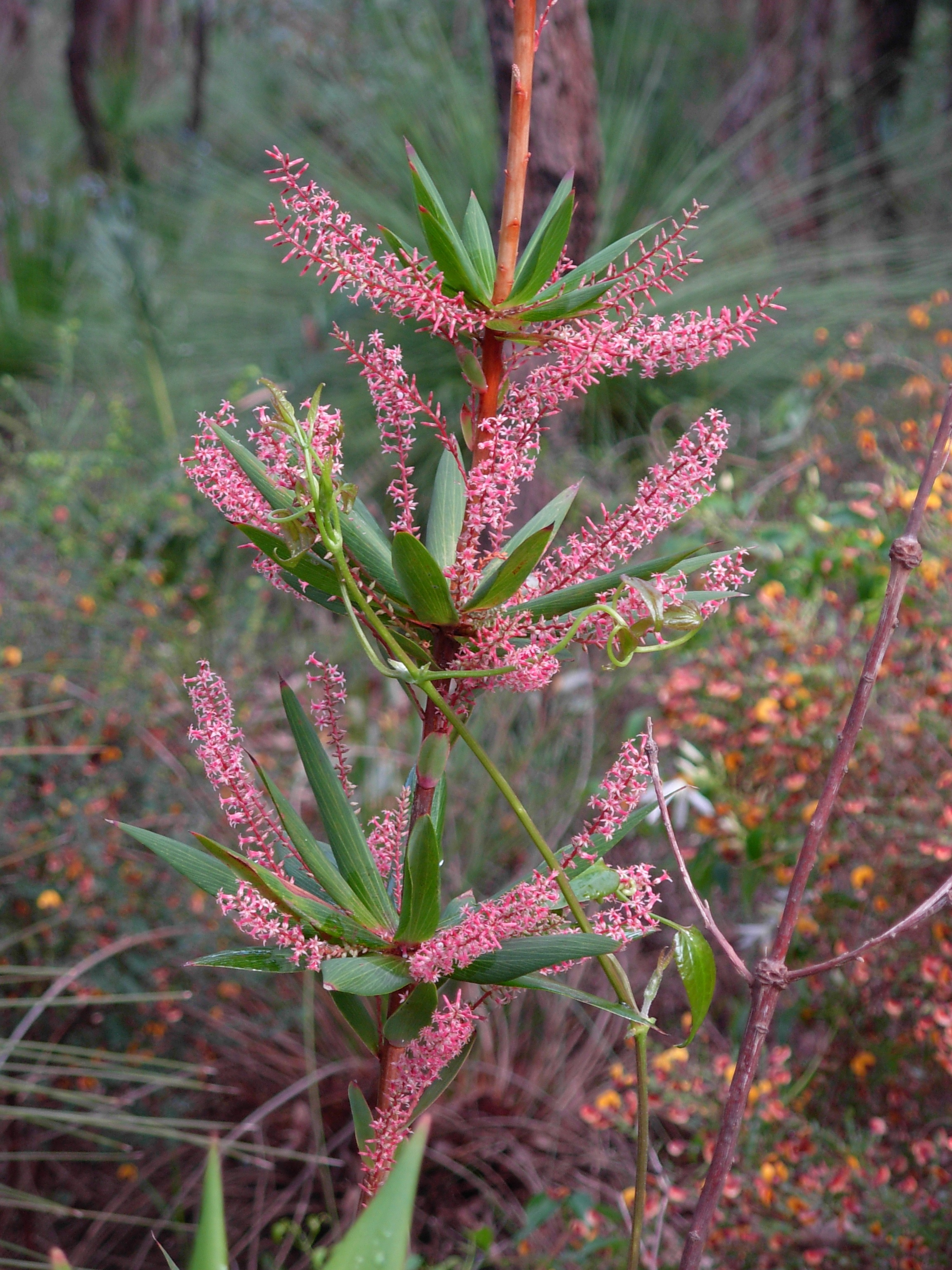
Leucopogon verticillatus flower

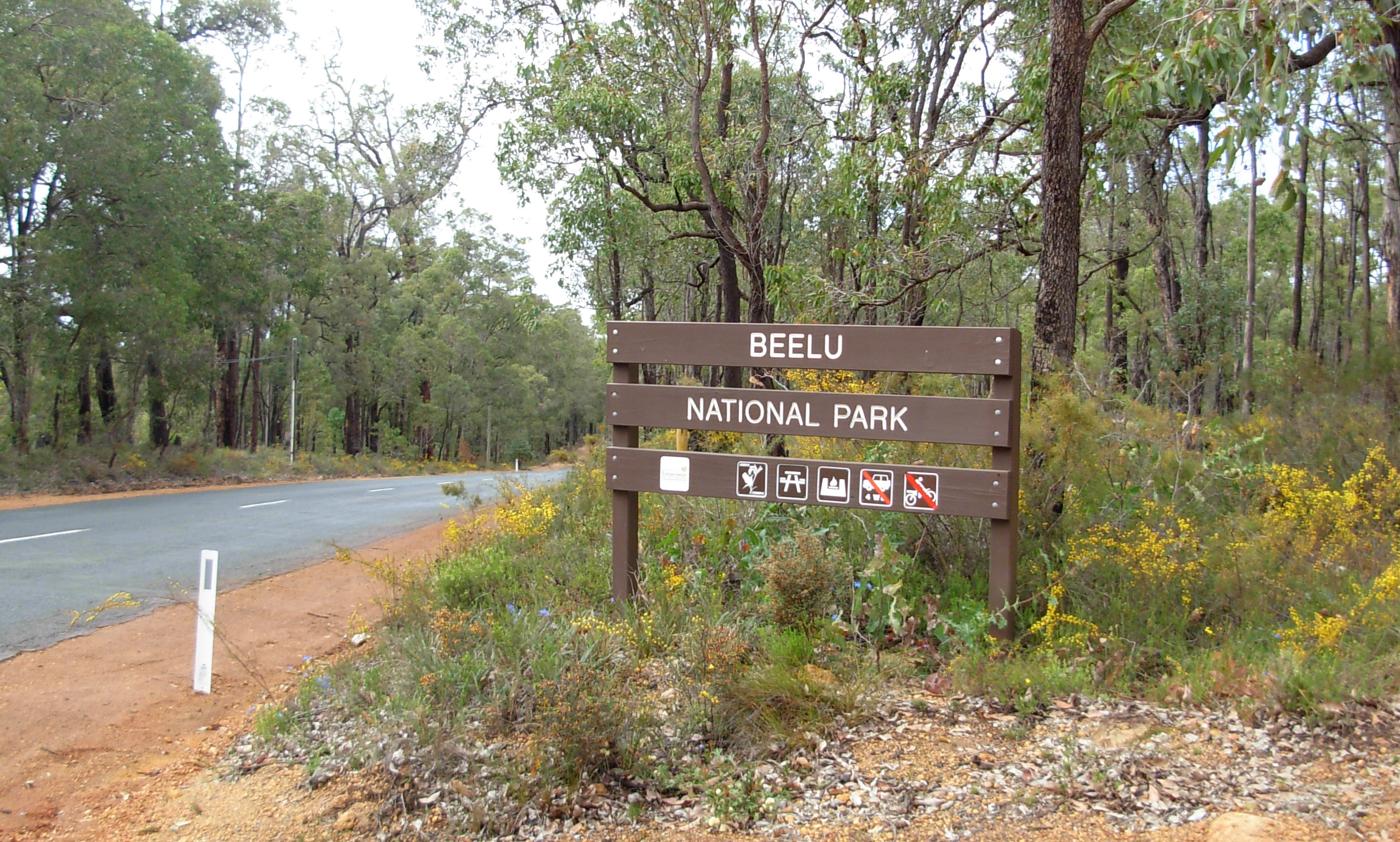
Mundaring Weir Road, Darling Range
