= Mount Dale =

Mountain in Western Australia

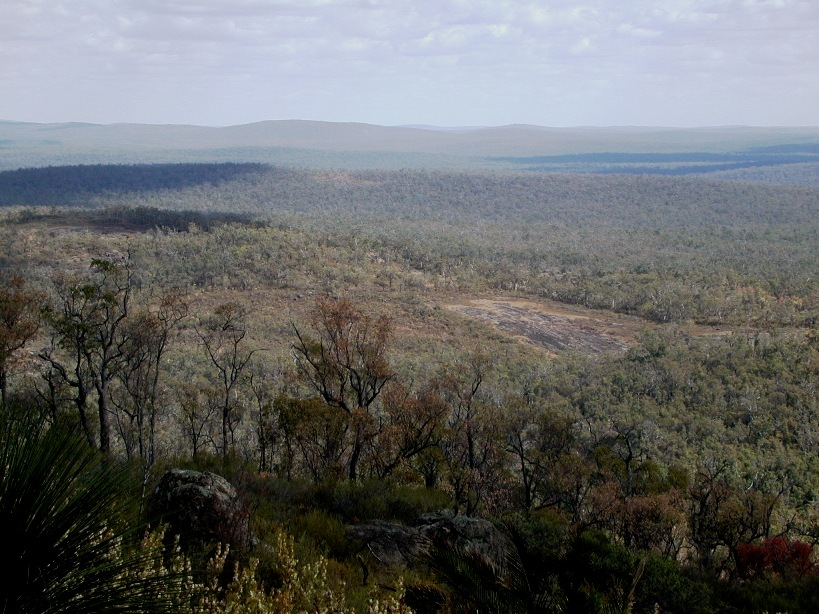
- View southeast from the summit of Mount Dale

Highest point
- Elevation: 546 m (1,791 ft)
- Coordinates: 32°07′36″S 116°17′58″E

Geography
- Location: East of Karragullen, Western Australia
- Parent range: Darling Scarp

Mount Dale is a mountain in Western Australia about 25 km (16 mi) east of Armadale in the Shire of Beverley. At 546 m (1,791 ft) high, it is one of the highest points in the Darling Scarp.

It is best known for its walk track, which forms part of the Bibbulmun Track. The track leads from a parking and picnic area to the summit, passing through 500 m (1,600 ft) of jarrah forest, which is coloured by a host of wildflowers in spring. South of Mundaring Weir, Mount Dale is visible when looking south-southeast from Glen Forrest outside Helena College on Bilgoman Road.

Mount Dale was once the site of a fire lookout tower as it provides almost uninterrupted 360° views over the National Park and surrounding State Forest areas.

This has now been replaced by a communications tower which obstructs the 360° panorama, though the footings of the old lookout tower and associated equipment are still visible among the undergrowth and stunning panoramic views are available from the parking area just below the peak. It was named after Robert Dale, who in 1829 became the first European explorer to venture into the Darling Scarp.

== See also ==
- Mount Cooke
- Mount Gunjin
