= Harold Curlewis =

Australian astronomer (1875–1968)

Harold Burnham Curlewis
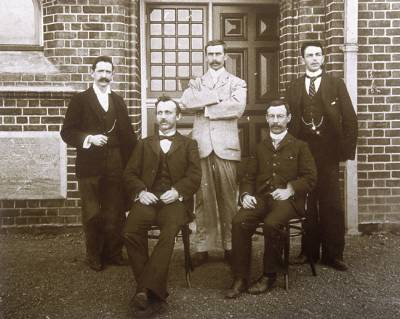
- Harold Curlewis standing middle back row
- Born: 6 October 1875; Geelong
- Died: 8 June 1968 (aged 92); Perth
- Occupation: Astronomer

Harold Burnham Curlewis (6 October 1875 – 8 June 1968) was an Australian astronomer. He was Acting Government Astronomer and Meteorologist in Western Australia from 1912 until his appointment as Government Astronomer in 1920. He held that position until 1940 and is credited with keeping the Perth Observatory open in face of government opposition. The asteroid 3898 Curlewis is named in his honour.

== Birth and education ==
Curlewis was born in Geelong, Victoria to Edgar and Louisa Curlewis and attended Newington College (1884–1893). In 1892 he won the Wigram Allen Scholarship, awarded by Sir George Wigram Allen, for mathematics, and in 1893 he won it for classics. At the end of 1893 Curlewis was named Dux of the College and received the Schofield Scholarship. He went up to the University of Sydney and in 1897 graduated as a Bachelor of Arts.

== Western Australian border ==
In 1920 and 1921 Curlewis was involved with the Government Astronomer of South Australia, in determinations to fix positions for marking of the Western Australia border on the ground with the South Australian border at Deakin, Western Australia. In 1921 the same group from the Deakin determinations travelled by the State Ship, MV Bambra to Wyndham, where they were guided by Michael Durack to a point near Argyle Downs close to the 129th meridian east longitude (129° east). They used wireless radio time signals, and other methods to fix a position for the Northern Territory border with Western Australia. These early determinations led to the 1968 agreement for the formation of Surveyor Generals Corner and a fact that not many will know, that the WA border is not as straight as you may think. In fact at the 26th parallel south latitude (26° south) latitude there is an approximately 127 metre "sideways" section of the WA/NT border, which runs east-west.

Awards
Preceded by Ernest Warren	Schofield Scholarship; Dux of Newington College; 1893	Succeeded by Walter Woolnough
