= The Heights Observatory =

Observatory in Adelaide, Australia

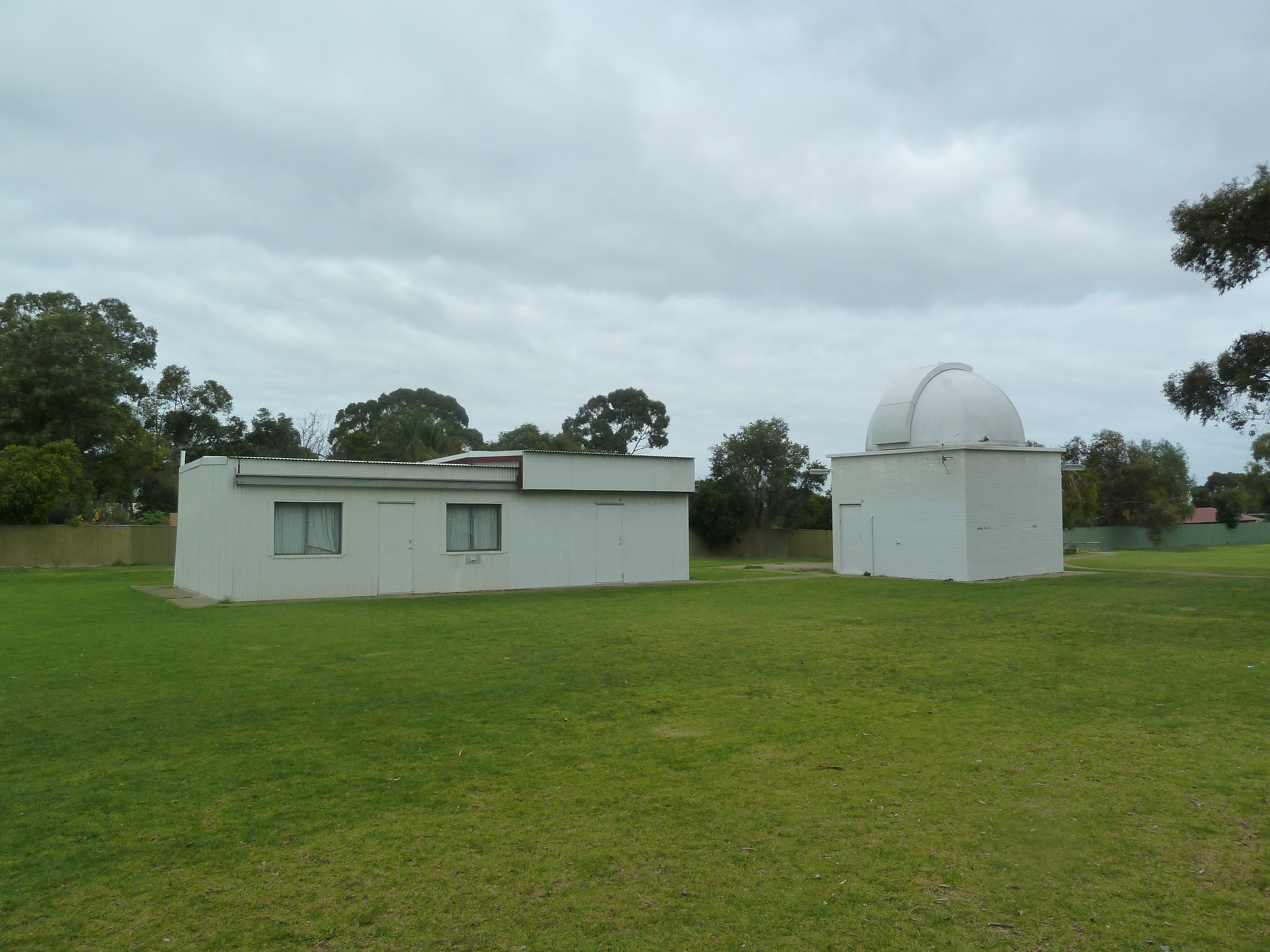
- Alternative names: Adelaide Observatory
- Organization: The Heights School
- Location: Modbury Heights, Adelaide, SA
- Coordinates: 34°48′45″S 138°40′56″E
- Altitude: 166 m (545 ft)

Telescopes
- Ingham Rooms: 12.5" RC Space-certified Ritchey–Chrétien from Optical Guidance Systems
- Dome: 14" Meade LX-200 GPS ACF
- 10" Dobsonian
- Related media on Commons

The Heights Observatory is an Astronomical Observatory at The Heights School in Modbury Heights, Adelaide, South Australia.

It is sometimes known as the Adelaide Observatory, but it is not to be confused with the observatory formerly established at the University of Adelaide.

== History ==
The Observatory consists of two buildings. In 1988–89, the Emanuel Papaelia Observatory (opened Nov'89) was built containing a 1963 vintage 12" Dall-Kirkham Cassegrain reflecting telescope belonging to the Astronomical Society of South Australia (ASSA), and originally housed at Marryatville High School. In 1996, a second building with a roll off roof (the Ingham Family Rooms) was constructed. This contained a second hand 10" Meade LX-200 Schmidt-Cassegrain telescope.

In August 2011, the 10" Meade in the Inghams building was replaced by a 14" Meade LX-200 GPS-ACF. This was purchased with a grant from the Education Minister (Jay Weatherill), topped up with fund-raising money from the STAR Group.

The observatory also houses a portable 10" Dobsonian, a 90mm computerised SkyWatcher refractor and two Coronado solar telescopes.

In April 2012, the Heights School purchased a research-grade, 12.5" space-certified Ritchey–Chrétien built by Optical Guidance Systems. That replaced the 14" LX200 in the roll off roof building, and in July 2012 the 14" LX200 was installed in the Dome, in place of the old ASSA 12" Dall-Kirkham, which was moved to ASSA's Stockport Observatory for storage.

== Current Activities ==
A group of students known as the STAR Group learns astronomy at an advanced level, both in theory and practice.

Students are actively involved with the observatory. In 2011, a Yr 12 Student used the original 10" LX200 and a 8bit DMK camera to detect the transit of an Exo-planet as his SACE Research Project.

Bimonthly, on the Friday night nearest the First Quarter Moon, the Astronomical Society of South Australia holds a public viewing night at the observatory, where members of the public can visit the observatory to view the night sky through the observatory's telescopes and telescopes brought in by members of ASSA. Members of STAR Group demonstrate real time imaging on their Research Grade OGS telescope, and show the Public through the 14" LX200 in the Dome and the portable scopes.

== See also ==
- List of astronomical observatories
