= Deakin, Western Australia =

Remote locality in Western Australia

Coordinates: 30.767°S 128.970°E

Deakin is a remote locality and is the last railway siding in Western Australia on the Trans-Australian Railway near the border of Western Australia and South Australia.

Deakin is important in the history of South Australia and Western Australia in the part it has played in the determinations of fixing the Western Australian border with South Australia by marking the border on the ground.

Historic sites close to Deakin are the Deakin Pillar (1921), from which the position was determined of the Deakin Obelisk (1926), being about 2.82 km to the east of the Deakin Pillar.

Both sites were used to fix the border, and the Deakin Obelisk is the point on the earth which determines the border with South Australia by a line taken from the centre of a copper plug embedded into the concrete obelisk. Both sites are close to the Trans-Australian Railway.
