= South Australia =

State of Australia

- State
- Flag Coat of arms
- Nickname(s): The Festival State; The Wine State
- Location of South Australia in Australia; 30°S 135°E
- Country: Australia
- Before federation: Province of South Australia
- Settlement: 15 August 1834
- Declared as Province: 19 February 1836
- Responsible government: 22 April 1857
- Federation: 1 January 1901
- Capital and largest city: Adelaide
- Administration: 74 local government areas
- Languages: South Australian English, Barossa German, Aboriginal languages, various others
- Demonym(s): South Australian; Croweater (colloquial); South Aussie
- Government: Federated parliamentary constitutional monarchy
  - Monarch: Charles III
  - Governor: Frances Adamson
  - Premier: Peter Malinauskas (ALP)
  - Chief Justice: Laura Stein
- Legislature: Parliament of South Australia
  - Upper house: Legislative Council
  - Lower house: House of Assembly
- Judiciary: Supreme Court of South Australia

Parliament of Australia
  - Senate: 12 senators (of 76)
  - House of Representatives: 10 seats (of 150)

Area
  - Total: 984,321 km^{2} (380,048 sq mi) (4th)
- Highest elevation (Mount Woodroffe): 1,435 m (4,708 ft)
- Lowest elevation (Kati Thanda–Lake Eyre): −16 m (−52 ft)

Population
  - 2026-03 estimate: 1,916,836 (5th)
  - Density: 1.95/km^{2} (5.1/sq mi) (6th)
- GSP: 2020 estimate
  - Total: AU$108.334 billion (5th)
  - Per capita: AU$61,582 (7th)
- HDI (2024): ▲0.944 very high · 6th (equal)
- Time zone: UTC+09:30 (ACST); UTC+08:45 (Border Village; DST not observed)
  - Summer (DST): UTC+10:30 (ACDT)
- Postal abbreviation: SA
- ISO 3166 code: AU–SA
- Symbols
- Bird: Piping shrike (Australian magpie)
- Fish: Leafy seadragon (Phycodurus eques)
- Flower: Sturt's Desert Pea (Swainsona formosa)
- Mammal: Southern hairy-nosed wombat (Lasiorhinus latifrons)
- Colour(s): Red, blue, and gold
- Fossil: Spriggina floundersi
- Mineral: Bornite, Opal as Gem
- Website: sa.gov.au

South Australia (commonly abbreviated as SA) (Note: German: Südaustralien [zyːtʔaʊ̯sˈtʁaːli̯ən], also just South Australia) is a state in the southern central part of Australia. With a total land area of 984,314 square kilometres (380,046 sq mi), it is the fourth-largest of Australia's states and territories by area, which includes some of the most arid parts of the continent. It is the 17th-largest subdivision in the world and the fifth-largest in Australasia. It is the second-most highly centralised state in the nation after Western Australia, with more than 67% of the 1.9 million South Australians living in the capital Adelaide or its environs. Other population centres in the state are relatively small; Mount Gambier is the second-largest centre, with a population of 26,878.

South Australia shares borders with all the other mainland states. It is bordered to the west by Western Australia, to the north by the Northern Territory, to the north-east by Queensland, to the east by New South Wales, and to the south-east by Victoria. To the south, its border is the ocean, the Great Australian Bight. (Note: Most Australians describe the body of water south of the continent as the Southern Ocean, rather than the Indian Ocean as officially defined by the International Hydrographic Organization (IHO). In the year 2000, a vote of IHO member nations defined the term "Southern Ocean" as applying only to the waters between Antarctica and 60 degrees south latitude.)

The state comprises less than 6.7% of the Australian population and ranks fifth in population among the six states and two territories. The majority of its people reside in greater Metropolitan Adelaide. Most of the remainder are settled in fertile areas along the south-eastern coast and River Murray. The state's colonial origins are unique in Australia as a freely settled, planned British province, rather than as a convict settlement. Colonial government commenced on 28 December 1836, when the members of the council were sworn in near the Old Gum Tree.

As with the rest of the continent, the region has a long history of human occupation by numerous groups and languages. The South Australian Company established a temporary settlement at Kingscote, Kangaroo Island, on 26 July 1836, five months before Adelaide was founded. The guiding principle behind settlement was that of systematic colonisation, a theory espoused by Edward Gibbon Wakefield that was later employed by the New Zealand Company. The goal was to establish the province as a centre of civilisation for free immigrants, promising civil liberties and religious tolerance. Although its history has been marked by periods of economic hardship, South Australia has remained politically innovative and culturally vibrant. Today, it is known for its fine wine and numerous cultural festivals. The state's economy is dominated by the agricultural, manufacturing and mining industries.

== History ==
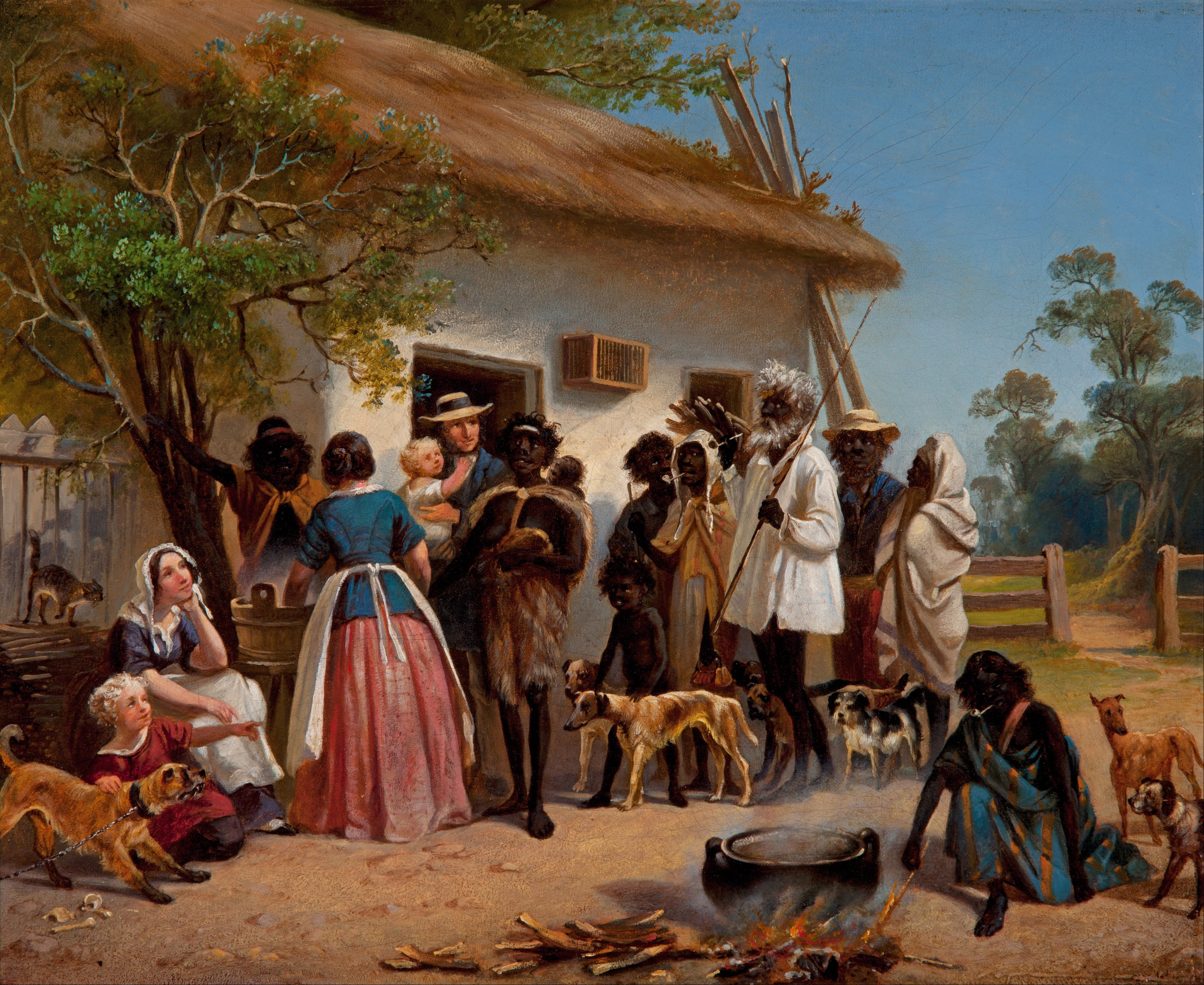
European settlers with Aboriginal Australians, 1850

Evidence of human activity in South Australia dates back as far as 20,000 years, with flint mining activity and rock art in the Koonalda Cave on the Nullarbor Plain. In addition wooden spears and tools were made in an area now covered in peat bog in the South East. Kangaroo Island was inhabited long before the island was cut off by rising sea levels. According to mitochondrial DNA research, Aboriginal people reached Eyre Peninsula 49,000-45,000 years ago from both the east (clockwise, along the coast, from northern Australia) and the west (anti-clockwise).

The first recorded European sighting of the South Australian coast was in 1627 when the Dutch ship the Gulden Zeepaert, captained by François Thijssen, examined and mapped a section of the coastline as far east as the Nuyts Archipelago. Thijssen named the whole of the country eastward of the Leeuwin "Nuyts Land", after a distinguished passenger on board; the Hon. Pieter Nuyts].

The coastline of South Australia was first mapped by Matthew Flinders and Nicolas Baudin in 1802, excepting the inlet later named the Port Adelaide River which was first discovered in 1831 by Captain Collet Barker and later accurately charted in 1836–37 by Colonel William Light, leader of the South Australian Colonisation Commissioners' 'First Expedition' and first Surveyor-General of South Australia.

The land which now forms the state of South Australia was claimed for Britain in 1788 as part of the colony of New South Wales. Although the new colony included almost two-thirds of the continent, early settlements were all on the eastern coast and only a few intrepid explorers ventured this far west. It took more than forty years before any serious proposal to establish settlements in the south-western portion of New South Wales were put forward.

On 15 August 1834, the British Parliament passed the South Australia Act 1834 (Foundation Act), which empowered His Majesty to erect and establish a province or provinces in southern Australia. The act stated that the land between 132° and 141° east longitude and from 26° south latitude to the southern ocean would be allotted to the intended colony, and it would be convict-free.

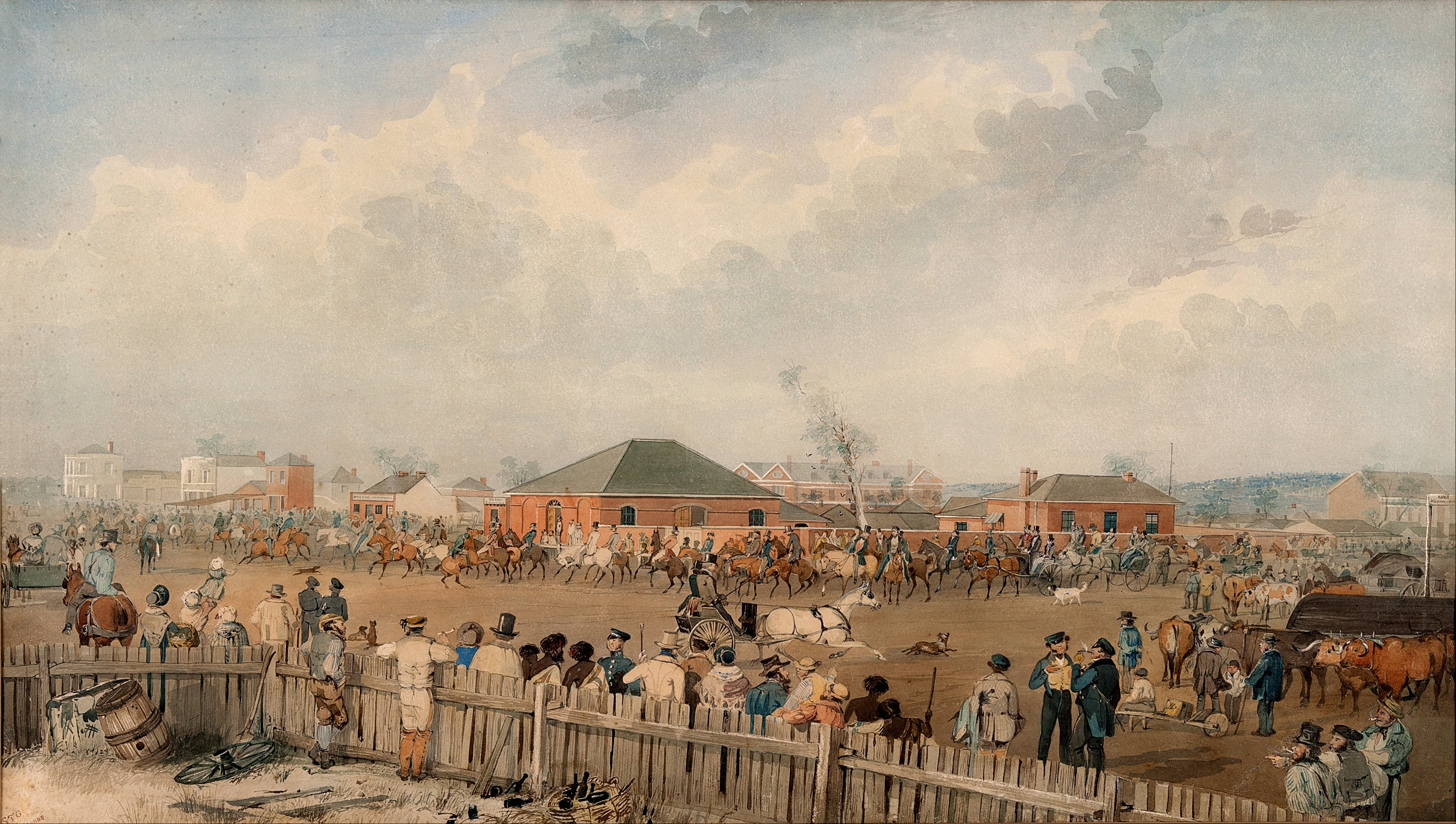
Charles Sturt's expedition leaving Adelaide for central Australia, 1844

In contrast to the rest of Australia, terra nullius did not apply to the new province. The Letters Patent, which used the enabling provisions of the South Australia Act 1834 to fix the boundaries of the Province of South Australia, provided that "nothing in those our Letters Patent shall affect or be construed to affect the rights of any Aboriginal Natives of the said Province to the actual occupation and enjoyment in their own Persons or in the Persons of their Descendants of any Lands therein now actually occupied or enjoyed by such Natives." Although the patent guaranteed land rights under force of law for the indigenous inhabitants, it was ignored by the South Australian Company authorities and squatters. Despite strong reference to the rights of the native population in the initial proclamation by the Governor, there were many conflicts and deaths in the Australian Frontier Wars in South Australia.

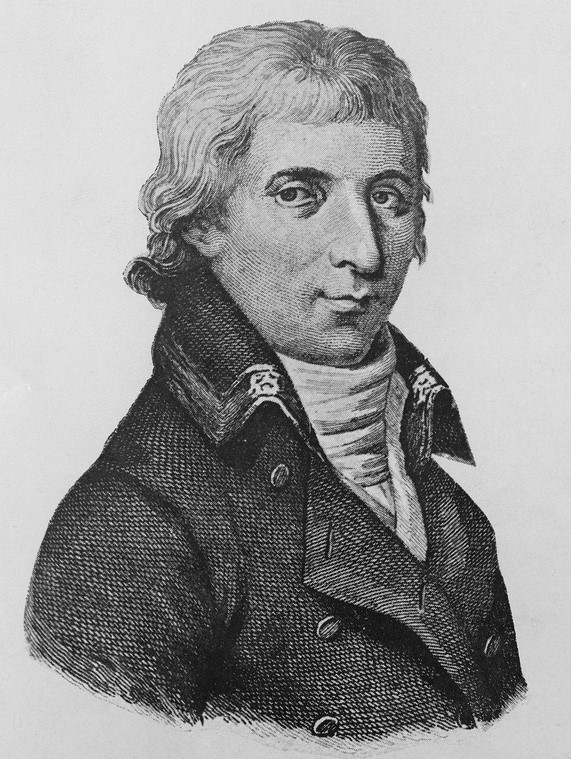
Nicolas Baudin, who mapped the coastline of South Australia, along with Matthew Flinders

Survey was required before settlement of the province, and the Colonisation Commissioners for South Australia appointed William Light as the leader of its 'First Expedition', tasked with examining 1500 miles of the South Australian coastline and selecting the best site for the capital, and with then planning and surveying the site of the city into one-acre Town Sections and its surrounds into 134-acre Country Sections.

Eager to commence the establishment of their whale and seal fisheries, the South Australian Company sought, and obtained, the Commissioners' permission to send Company ships to South Australia, in advance of the surveys and ahead of the Commissioners' colonists.

The company's settlement of seven vessels and 636 people was temporarily made at Kingscote on Kangaroo Island, until the official site of the capital was selected by William Light, where the City of Adelaide is currently located. The first immigrants arrived at Holdfast Bay (near the present day Glenelg) in November 1836.

The commencement of colonial government was proclaimed on 28 December 1836, now known as Proclamation Day.

South Australia is the only Australian state to have never received British convicts. However, some emancipated or escaped convicts or expirees made their own way there, and constituted 1–2% of the early population. The plan for the province was that it would be an experiment in reform, addressing the problems perceived in British society. There was to be religious freedom and no established religion. Sales of land to colonists created an Emigration Fund to pay the costs of transferring a poor young labouring population to South Australia. In early 1838 the colonists became concerned after it was reported that convicts who had escaped from the eastern states might make their way to South Australia. The South Australia Police was formed in April 1838 to protect the community and enforce government regulations. Their principal role was to run the first temporary gaol, a two-room hut.

The current flag of South Australia was adopted on 13 January 1904, and is a British blue ensign defaced with the state badge. The badge is described as a piping shrike with wings outstretched on a yellow disc. The state badge is believed to have been designed by Robert Craig of Adelaide's School of Design.

== Geography ==
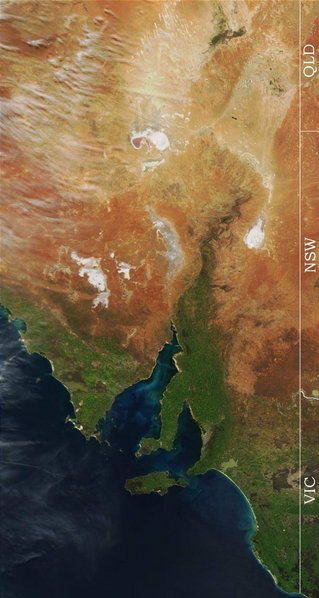
A satellite image of eastern South Australia. Note the dry lakes (white patches) in the north.

The terrain consists largely of arid and semi-arid rangelands, with several low mountain ranges. The most important (but not tallest) is the Mount Lofty-Flinders Ranges system, which extends north about 800 kilometres (500 mi) from Cape Jervis to the northern end of Lake Torrens. The highest point in the state is not in those ranges; Mount Woodroffe (1,435 metres (4,708 ft)) is in the Musgrave Ranges in the extreme northwest of the state.

The south-western portion of the state consists of the sparsely inhabited Nullarbor Plain, fronted by the cliffs of the Great Australian Bight. Features of the coast include Spencer Gulf and the Eyre and Yorke Peninsulas that surround it. The Temperate Grassland of South Australia is situated to the east of Gulf St Vincent.

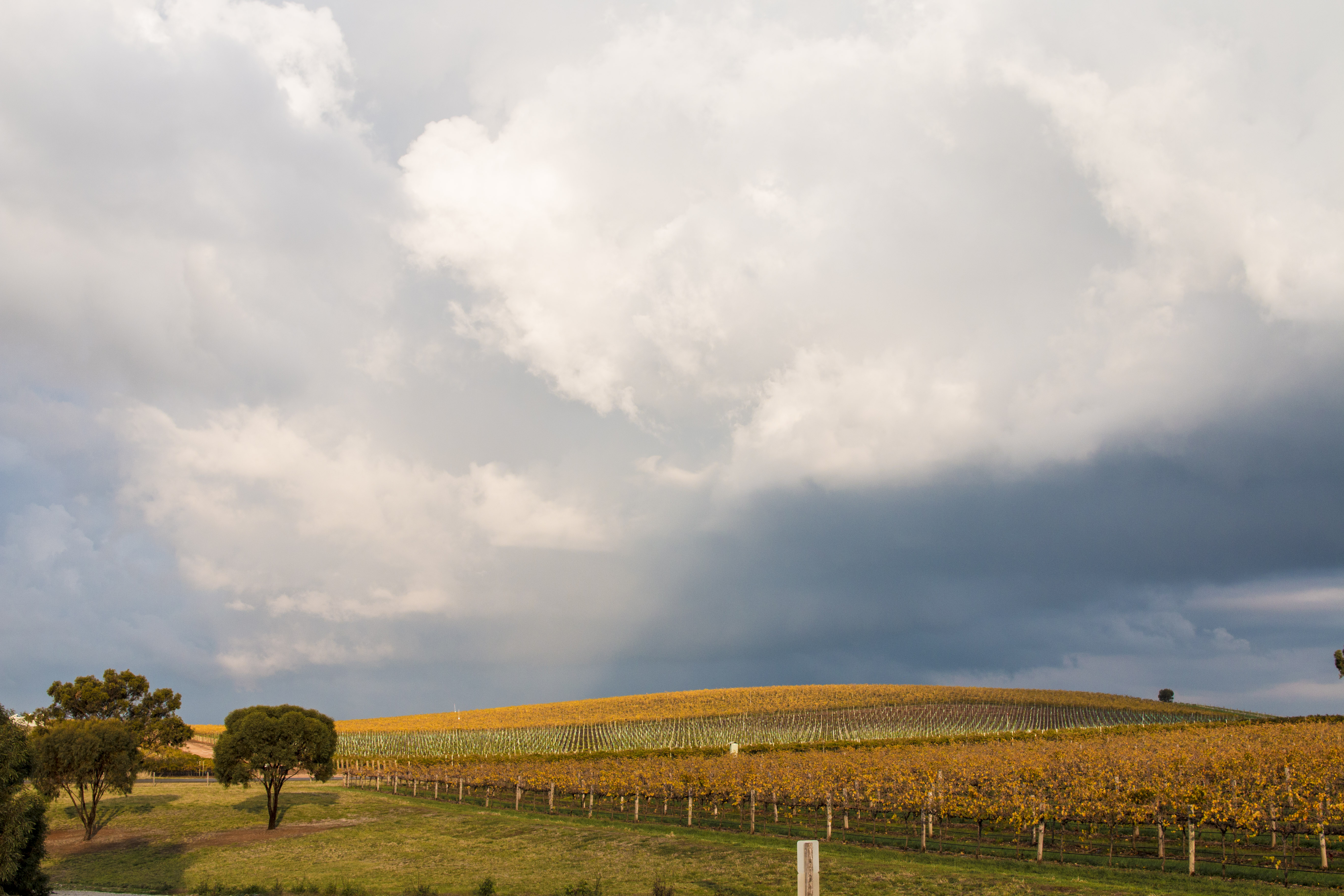
The Barossa Valley, northeast of Adelaide. South Australia's wine industry is the largest in Australia.

The different Köppen climate types in South Australia

The principal industries and exports of South Australia are wheat, wine and wool. More than half of Australia's wines are produced in the South Australian wine regions which principally include Barossa Valley, Clare Valley, McLaren Vale, Coonawarra, the Riverland and the Adelaide Hills. See South Australian wine.

=== South Australian boundaries ===
South Australia has boundaries with every other Australian mainland state and territory except the Australian Capital Territory and the Jervis Bay Territory. The Western Australia border has a history involving the South Australian government astronomer, G.F. Dodwell, and the Western Australian Government Astronomer, H.B. Curlewis, marking the border on the ground in the 1920s.

In 1863, that part of New South Wales to the north of South Australia was annexed to South Australia, by letters patent, as the "Northern Territory of South Australia", which became shortened to the Northern Territory on 6 July 1863. The Northern Territory was handed to the federal government in 1911 and became a separate territory.

According to Australian maps, South Australia's south coast is flanked by the Southern Ocean, but official international consensus defines the Southern Ocean as extending north from the pole only to 60°S or 55°S, at least 17 degrees of latitude further south than the most southern point of South Australia. Thus the south coast is officially adjacent to the south-most portion of the Indian Ocean. See Southern Ocean: Existence and definitions.

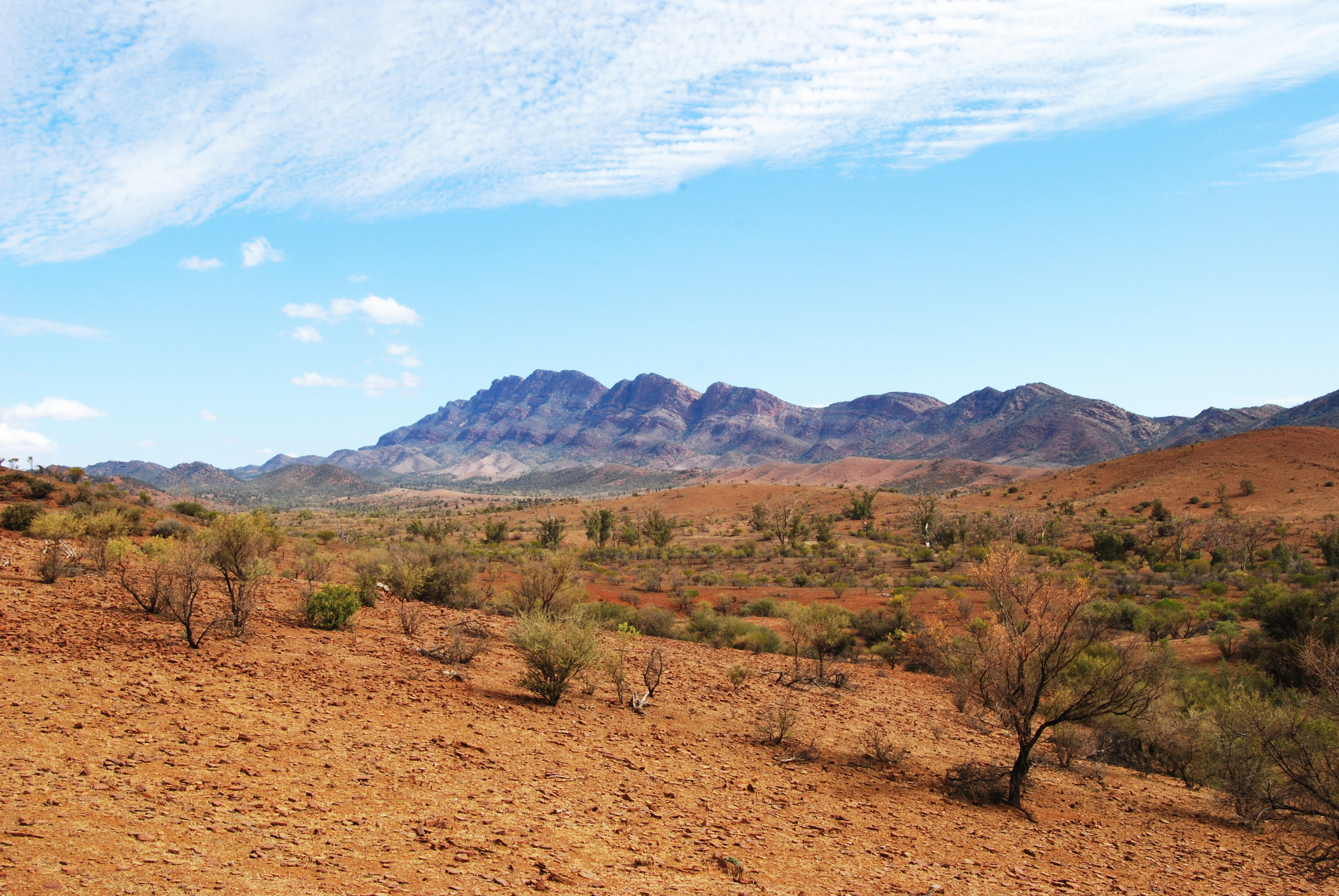
Arid land in the Flinders Ranges

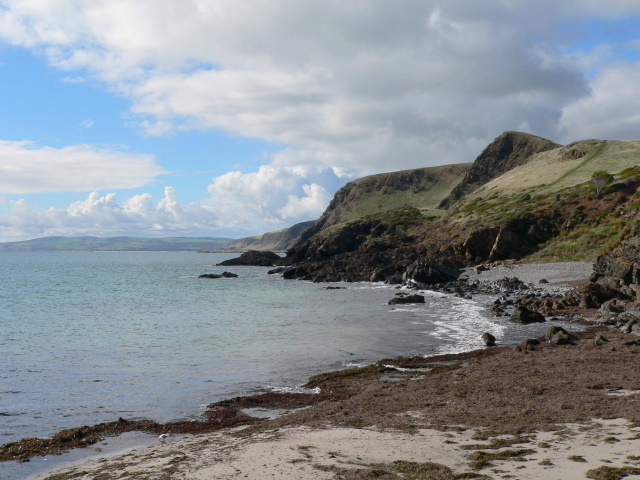
The rugged coastline of Second Valley, located on the Fleurieu Peninsula

=== Climate ===
Due to the elevation, the Adelaide Hills region receives light snowfalls in winter, though it is a rare occurrence. This image depicts a snowstorm at Lobethal, 28 July 1901.

The southern part of the state has a Mediterranean climate, while the rest of the state has either an arid or semi-arid climate. South Australia's main temperature range is 29 °C (84 °F) in January and 15 °C (59 °F) in July. The highest maximum temperature ever recorded was 50.7 °C (123.3 °F) at Oodnadatta on 2 January 1960, which is the highest official temperature recorded in Australia. The lowest minimum temperature was −8.2 °C (17.2 °F) at Yongala on 20 July 1976. The region's overall dry weather is owed to the Australian High on the Great Australian Bight.

Climate data for South Australia
Month	Jan	Feb	Mar	Apr	May	Jun	Jul	Aug	Sep	Oct	Nov	Dec	Year
Record high °C (°F)	50.7 (123.3)	48.2 (118.8)	46.5 (115.7)	42.1 (107.8)	36.5 (97.7)	34.0 (93.2)	34.2 (93.6)	39.4 (102.9)	41.5 (106.7)	45.4 (113.7)	47.9 (118.2)	49.9 (121.8)	50.7 (123.3)
Record low °C (°F)	0.2 (32.4)	0.8 (33.4)	−2.2 (28.0)	−3.5 (25.7)	−6.6 (20.1)	−8.1 (17.4)	−8.2 (17.2)	−6.6 (20.1)	−4.5 (23.9)	−4.4 (24.1)	−2.4 (27.7)	−0.5 (31.1)	−8.2 (17.2)
Source: Bureau of Meteorology

== Economy ==
Flinders Medical Centre. The health care sector is a major employer in South Australia's economy.

As of 2016, South Australia had 746,105 people employed out of a total workforce of 806,593, giving an unemployment rate of 7.5%. South Australia's largest employment sector is health care and social assistance, making up 14.8% of the state's total employment, followed by retail (10.7%), education and training (8.6%), manufacturing (8%), and construction (7.6%). South Australia's economy relies on exports more than any other state in Australia.

South Australia's credit rating was upgraded to AAA by Standard & Poor's in September 2004 and to AAA by Moody's in November 2004, the highest credit ratings achievable by any company or sovereign. The state had previously lost these ratings in the State Bank collapse. However, in 2012 Standard & Poor's downgraded the state's credit rating to AA+ due to declining revenues, new spending initiatives and a weaker than expected budgetary outlook.

South Australia receives the least amount of federal funding for its local road network of all states on a per capita and a per kilometre basis.

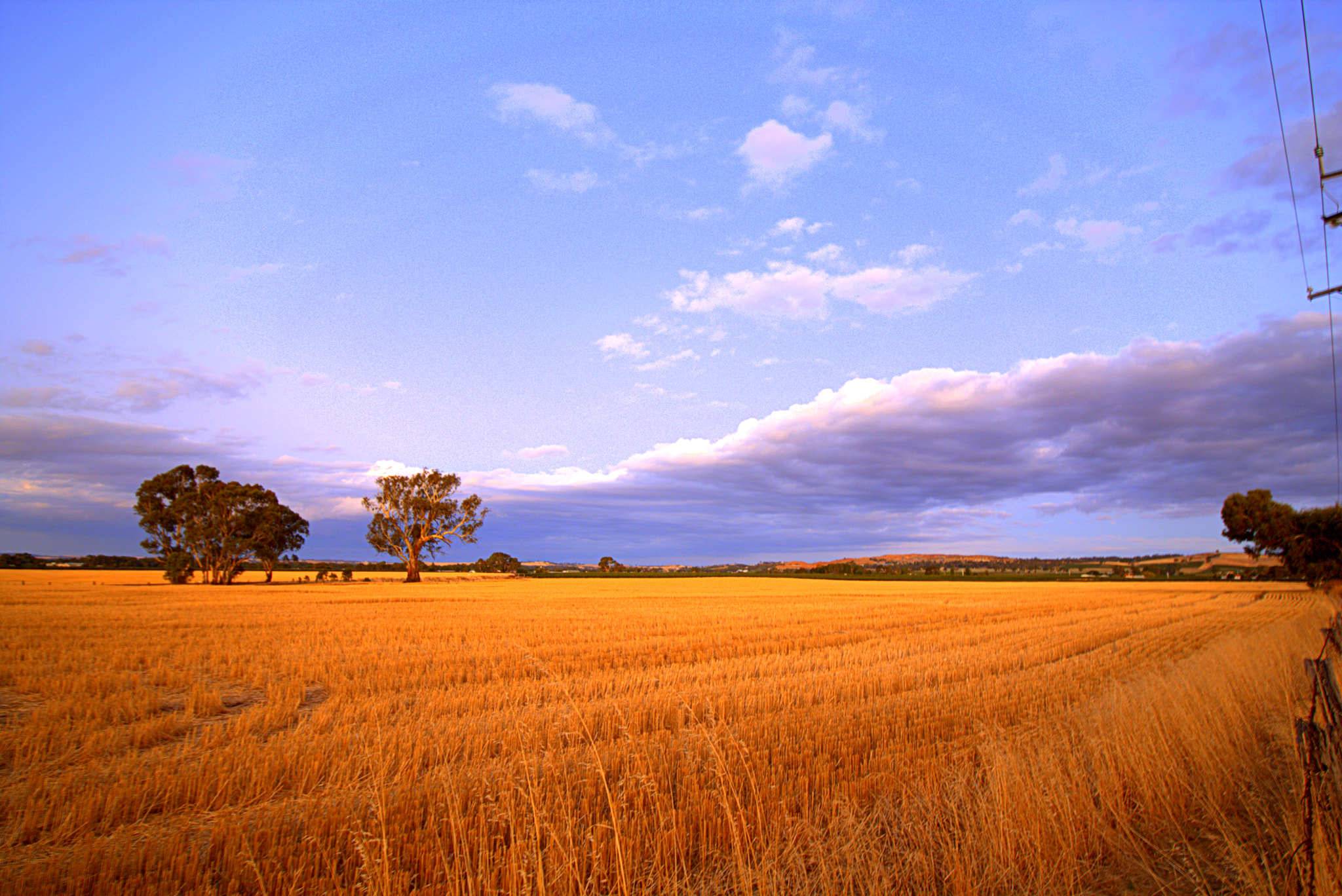
Wheat fields at Nuriootpa. Agriculture is a large industry for the state.

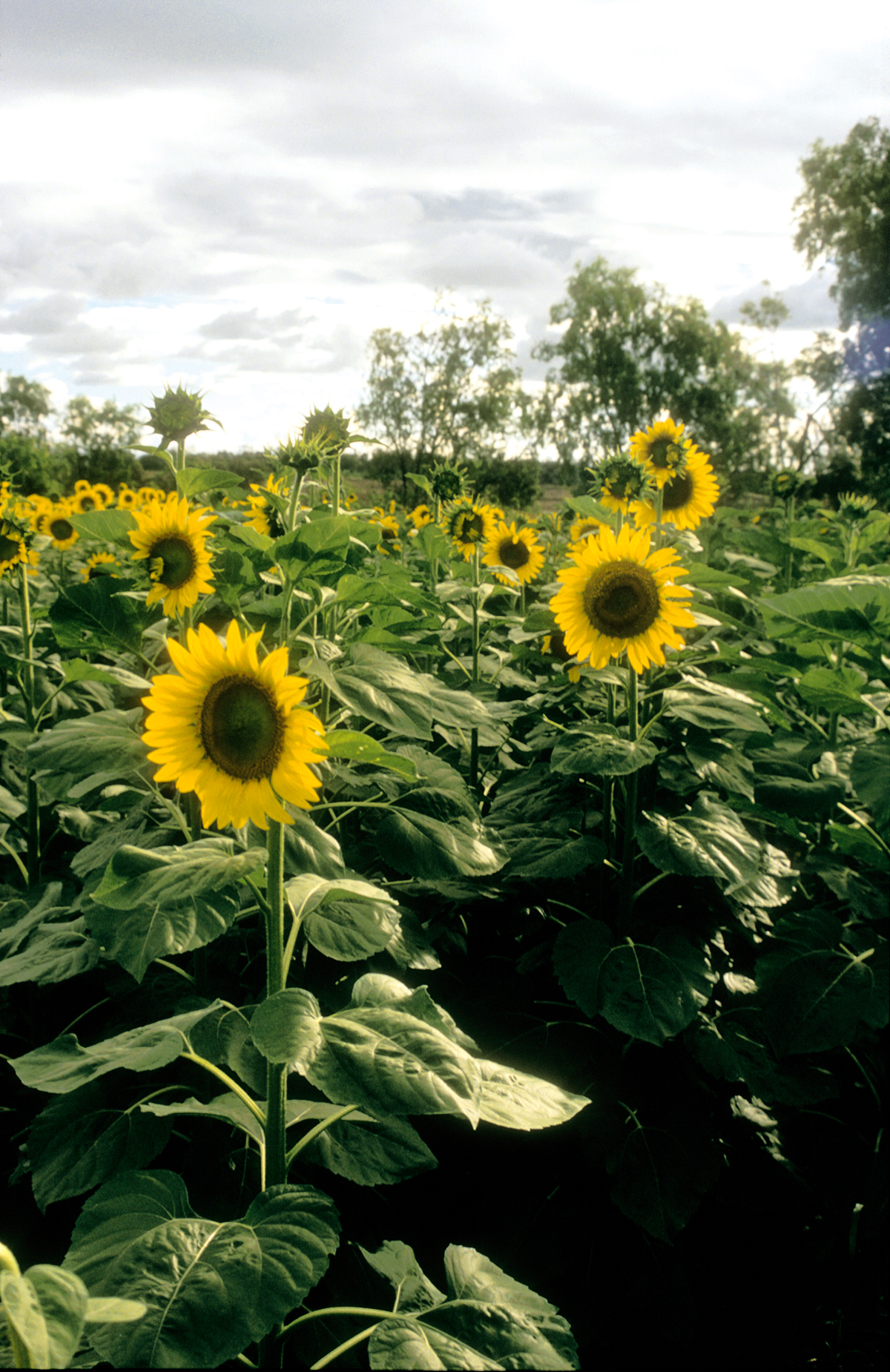
Sunflower crop in the Adelaide Hills

During 2019–20: South Australia's gross state product (GSP) fell 1.4% in chain volume (real) terms (nationally, gross domestic product (GDP) fell 0.3%). South Australia came out of the COVID-19 recession better than the other Australian states, with the economy growing by 3.9% in the 2020–21 financial year. This was the first time since the Australian Bureau of Statistics began collecting data in 1990 that South Australia had outperformed the other states. The recovery was driven in part by growth in the agricultural sector, which increased its production by almost 24% thanks to the end of a drought.

=== Agriculture ===
==== Cereals, legumes and oilseeds ====
Wheat, barley, oats, rye, peas, beans, chickpeas, lentils and canola are grown in South Australia.

==== Fruit and vegetables ====
Apples, pears, cherries and strawberries are grown in the Adelaide Hills. Tomatoes, capsicums, cucumbers, brassicas, lettuce and carrots are grown on the Northern Adelaide Plains at Virginia. Almonds, citrus and stone fruit are grown in the Riverland. Potatoes, onions and carrots are grown in the Murray Mallee region. Potatoes are grown on Kangaroo Island.

==== Viticulture ====
South Australia produces more than half of all Australian wine, including almost 80% of Australia's premium wines.

=== Energy ===
South Australia has the lead over other Australian states for its commercialisation and commitment to renewable energy. It is now the leading producer of wind power in Australia. Renewable energy is a growing source of electricity in South Australia, and there is potential for growth from this particular industry of the state's economy. The Hornsdale Power Reserve is a bank of grid-connected batteries adjacent to the Hornsdale Wind Farm in South Australia's Mid-North region. At the time of construction in late 2017, it was billed as the largest lithium-ion battery in the world.

=== Mining ===
The Olympic Dam mine near Roxby Downs in northern South Australia is the largest deposit of uranium in the world, possessing more than a third of the world's low-cost recoverable reserves and 70% of Australia's. The mine, owned and operated by BHP, presently accounts for 9% of global uranium production. The Olympic Dam mine is also the world's fourth-largest remaining copper deposit, and the world's fifth largest gold deposit. There was a proposal to vastly expand the operations of the mine, making it the largest open-cut mine in the world, but in 2012 the BHP Billiton board decided not to go ahead with it at that time due to then lower commodity prices.

The remote town of Coober Pedy produces more opal than anywhere else in the world. Opal was first discovered near the town in 1915, and the town became the site of an opal rush, enticing immigrants from southern and eastern Europe in the aftermath of World War II.

=== Education and research ===
Higher education and research in Adelaide forms an important part of South Australia's economy. The South Australian Government and educational institutions have attempted to position Adelaide as Australia's education hub and have marketed it as a Learning City. The number of international students studying in Adelaide has increased rapidly in recent years to 30,726 in 2015, of which 1,824 were secondary school students. Foreign institutions have been attracted to set up campuses to increase its attractiveness as an education hub. Adelaide is the birthplace of three Nobel laureates, more than any other Australian city: physicist William Lawrence Bragg and pathologists Howard Florey and Robin Warren, all of whom completed secondary and tertiary education at St Peter's College and the University of Adelaide.

Adelaide is home to research institutes, including the Royal Institution of Australia, established in 2009 as a counterpart to the two-hundred-year-old Royal Institution of Great Britain. Most of the research organisations are clustered in the Adelaide metropolitan area:

- The east end of North Terrace: SA Pathology; Hanson Institute; National Wine Centre.
- The west end of North Terrace: South Australian Health and Medical Research Institute (SAHMRI), located next to the Royal Adelaide Hospital.
- The Waite Research Precinct: SARDI Head Office and Plant Research Centre; AWRI; ACPFG; CSIRO research laboratories. SARDI also has establishments at Glenside and West Beach.
- Edinburgh, South Australia: DSTO; BAE Systems (Australia); Lockheed Martin Australia Electronic Systems.
- Technology Park (Mawson Lakes): BAE Systems; Optus; Raytheon; Topcon; Lockheed Martin Australia Electronic Systems.
- Research Park at Thebarton: businesses involved in materials engineering, biotechnology, environmental services, information technology, industrial design, laser/optics technology, health products, engineering services, radar systems, telecommunications and petroleum services.
- Science Park (adjacent to Flinders University): Playford Capital.
- The Basil Hetzel Institute for Translational Health Research in Woodville the research arm of the Queen Elizabeth Hospital, Adelaide
- The Joanna Briggs Institute, a global research collaboration for evidence-based healthcare with its headquarters in North Adelaide.
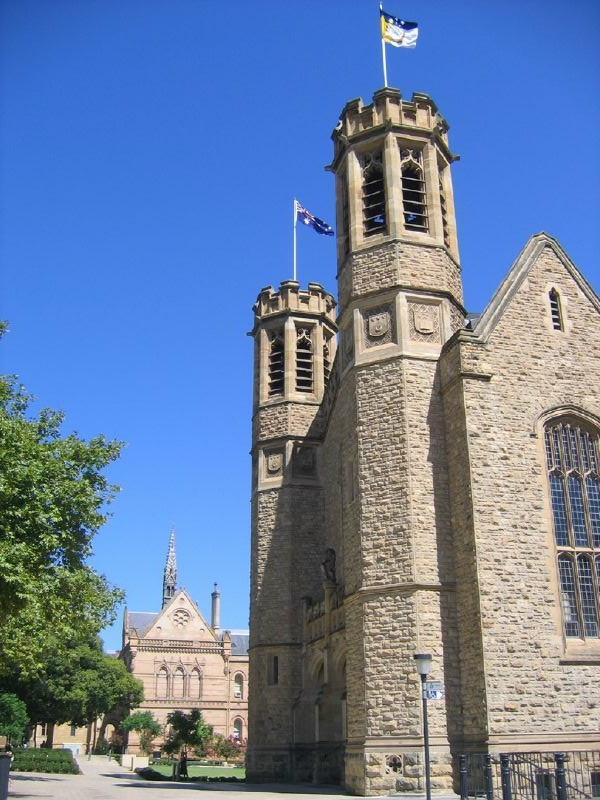
The Mitchell Building and Bonython Hall, University of Adelaide

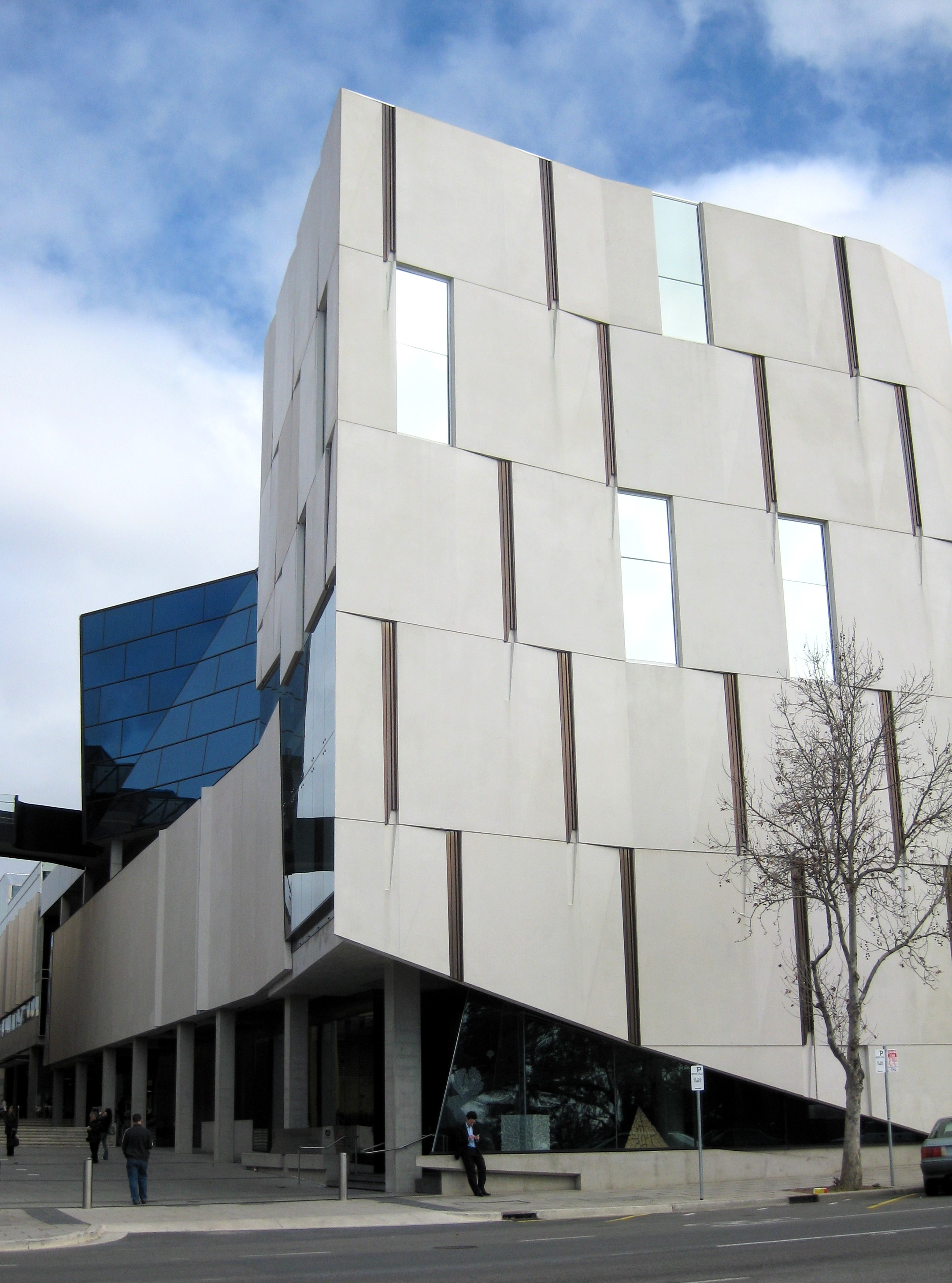
The Hawke Building, part of the UniSA, City West Campus

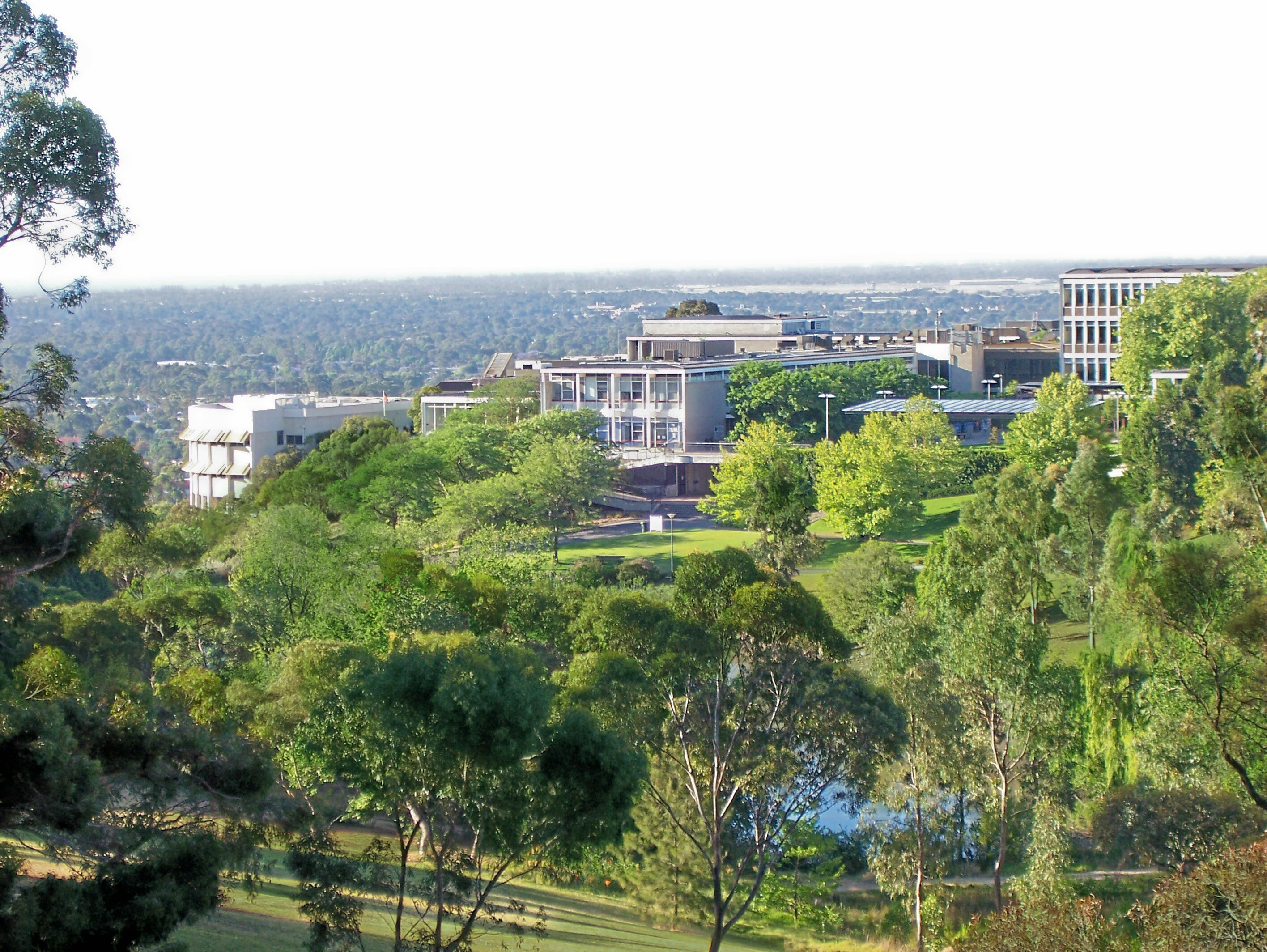
Flinders University buildings from the campus hills

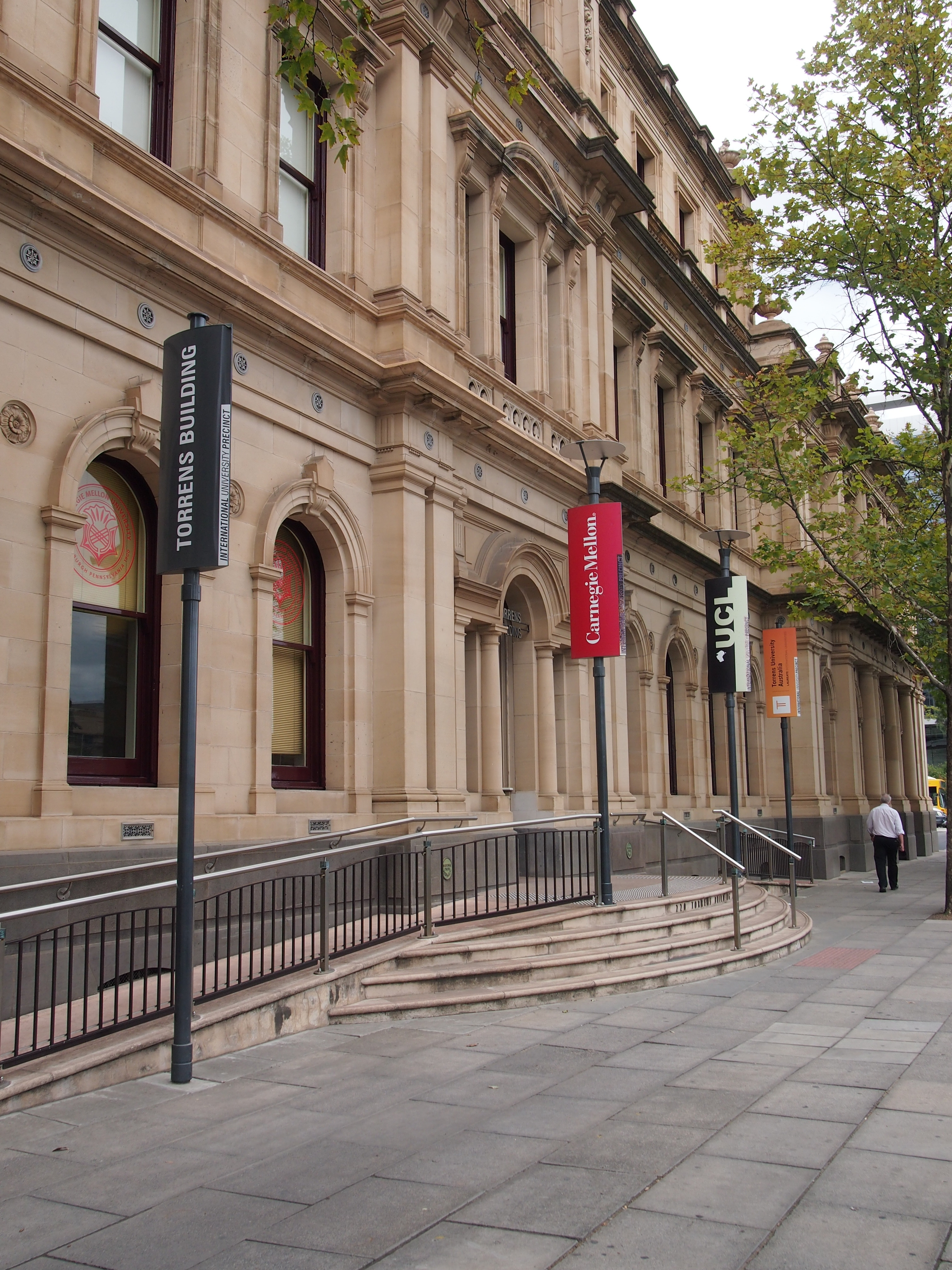
Torrens University

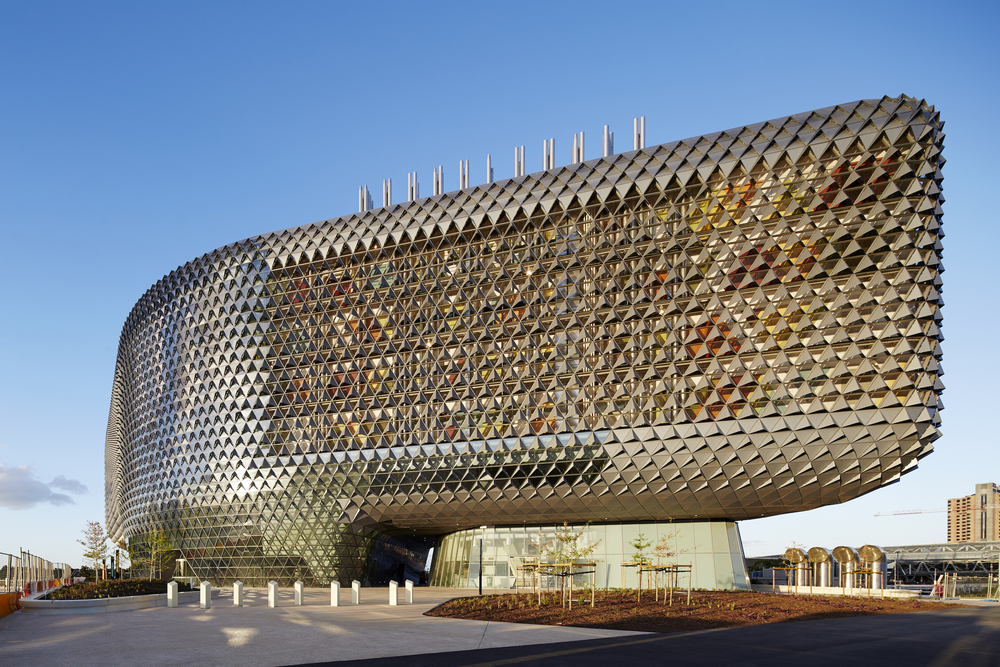
The South Australian Health and Medical Research Institute (SAHMRI)

== Government ==
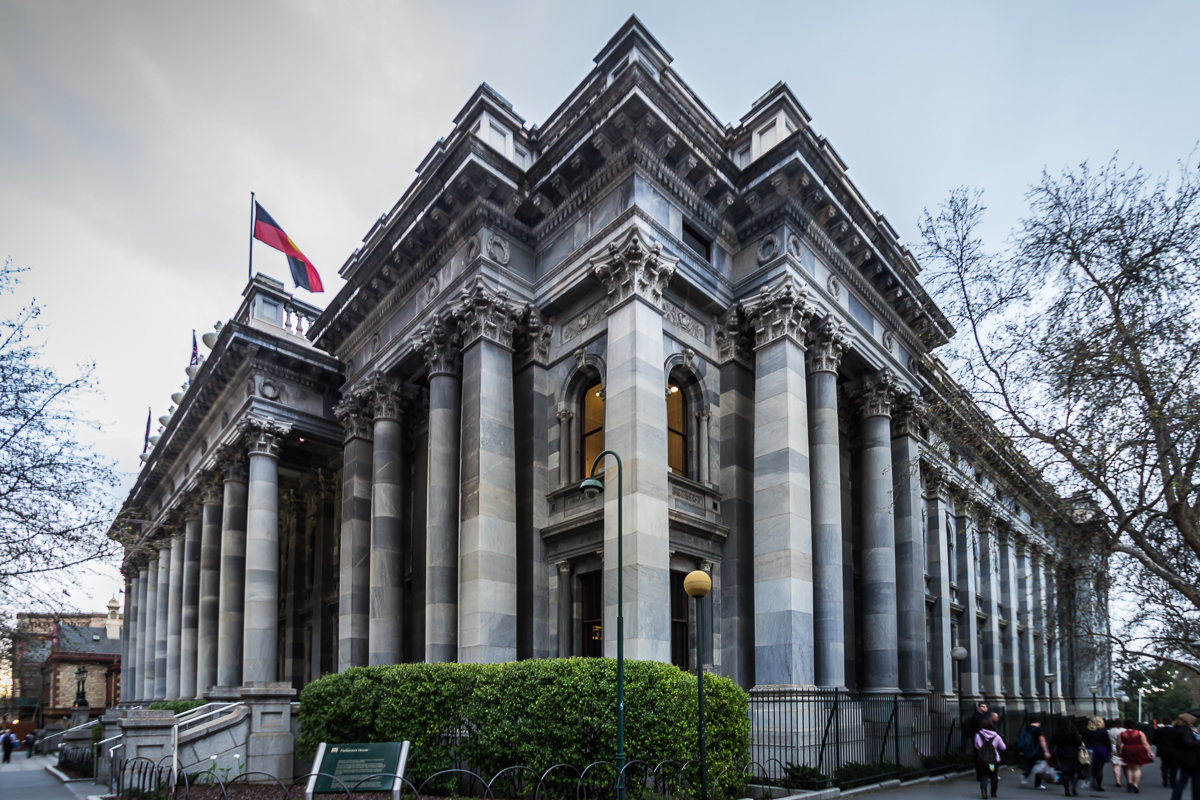
Parliament House, Adelaide

South Australia is a constitutional monarchy with King Charles III as sovereign, and the Governor of South Australia as his representative. It is a state of the Commonwealth of Australia. The bicameral Parliament of South Australia consists of the lower house known as the House of Assembly and the upper house known as the Legislative Council. General elections are held every four years, the last being the 2022 election.

Initially, the Governor of South Australia held almost total power, derived from the letters patent of the imperial government to create the colony. He was accountable only to the British Colonial Office, and thus democracy did not exist in the colony. A new body was created to advise the governor on the administration of South Australia in 1843 called the Legislative Council. It consisted of three representatives of the British Government and four colonists appointed by the governor. The governor retained total executive power.

In 1851, the Imperial Parliament enacted the Australian Constitutions Act 1850 (13 & 14 Vict. c. 59 (Imp)), which allowed for the election of representatives to each of the colonial legislatures and the drafting of a constitution to properly create representative and responsible government in South Australia. Later that year, propertied male colonists were allowed to vote for 16 members on a new 24 seat Legislative Council. Eight members continued to be appointed by the governor.

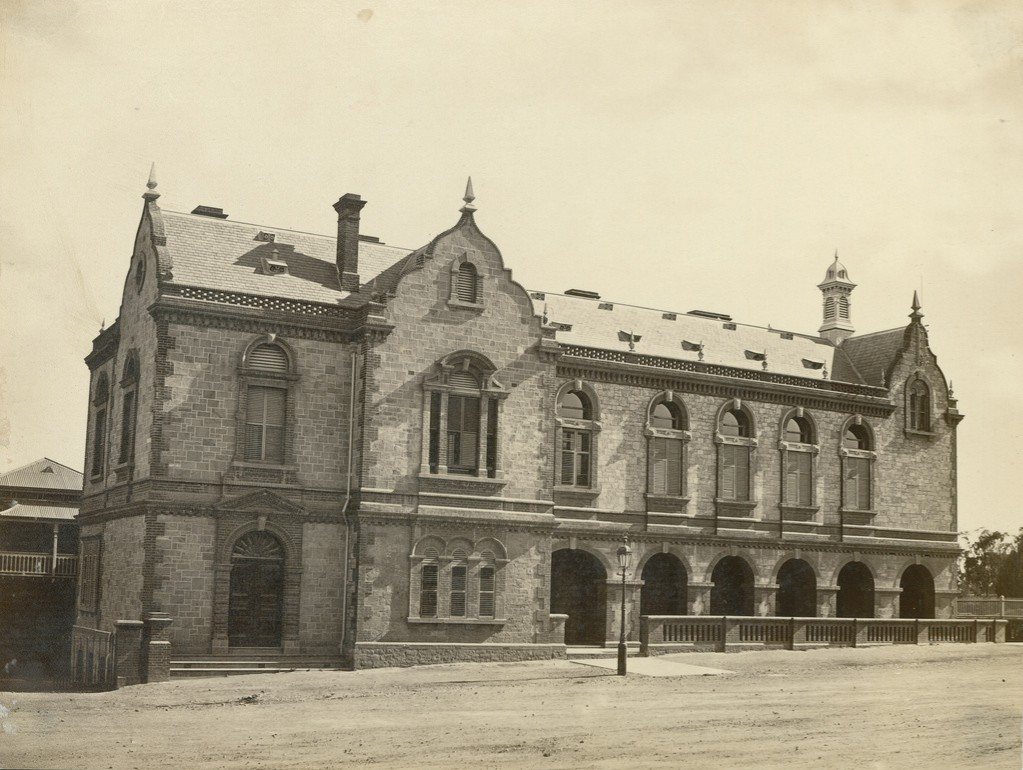
Old Parliament House in 1872

The main responsibility of this body was to draft a constitution for South Australia. The body drafted the most democratic constitution ever seen in the British Empire and provided for universal manhood suffrage. It created the bicameral Parliament of South Australia. For the first time in the colony, the executive was elected by the people, and the colony used the Westminster system, where the government is the party or coalition that exerts a majority in the House of Assembly. The Legislative Council remained a predominantly conservative chamber elected by property owners.

Composition of the Parliament of South Australia (2026)
Party	House	Council
Labor	34	10
Liberal	5	6
Family First	0	1
Greens	0	2
Independent	4	0
One Nation	4	3
Total	47	22
Source: Electoral Commission SA

Women's suffrage in Australia took a leap forward – enacted in 1895 and taking effect from the 1896 colonial election, South Australia was the first government in Australia and only the second in the world after New Zealand to allow women to vote, and the first in the world to allow women to stand for election. In 1897 Catherine Helen Spence was the first woman in Australia to be a candidate for political office when she was nominated to be one of South Australia's delegates to the conventions that drafted the constitution. South Australia became an original state of the Commonwealth of Australia on 1 January 1901.

Although the lower house had universal suffrage, the upper house, the Legislative Council, remained the exclusive domain of property owners until the Labor government of Don Dunstan managed to achieve reform of the chamber in 1973. Property qualifications were removed and the Council became a body elected via proportional representation by a single state-wide electorate. Since the following 1975 South Australian state election, no one party has had control of the state's upper house with the balance of power controlled by a variety of minor parties and independents.

=== Local government ===
Local government in South Australia is established by the Constitution Act 1934 (SA), the Local Government Act 1999 (SA), and the Local Government (Elections) Act 1999 (SA). South Australia contains 68 councils and 6 Aboriginal and outback communities. Local councils, elected on a four-yearly basis, are responsible for local roads and stormwater management, waste collection, planning and development, fire prevention and hazard management, dog and cat management and control, parking control, public health and food inspections, and other services for their local communities. Councils have the power to raise revenue for their activities, which is mostly achieved through "council rates", a tax based on property valuations. Council rates make up about 70% of council revenue, but account for less than 4% of total taxes paid by Australians.

== Demographics ==
Country of Birth (2016)
Birthplace (Note: In accordance with the Australian Bureau of Statistics source, England, Scotland, China and the Special Administrative Regions of Hong Kong and Macau are listed separately)	Population
Australia	1,192,546
England	97,392
India	27,594
China	24,610
Italy	18,544
Vietnam	14,337
New Zealand	12,937
Philippines	12,465
Scotland	11,993
Germany	10,119
Greece	8,682
Malaysia	7,749
South Africa	6,610
Afghanistan	6,313

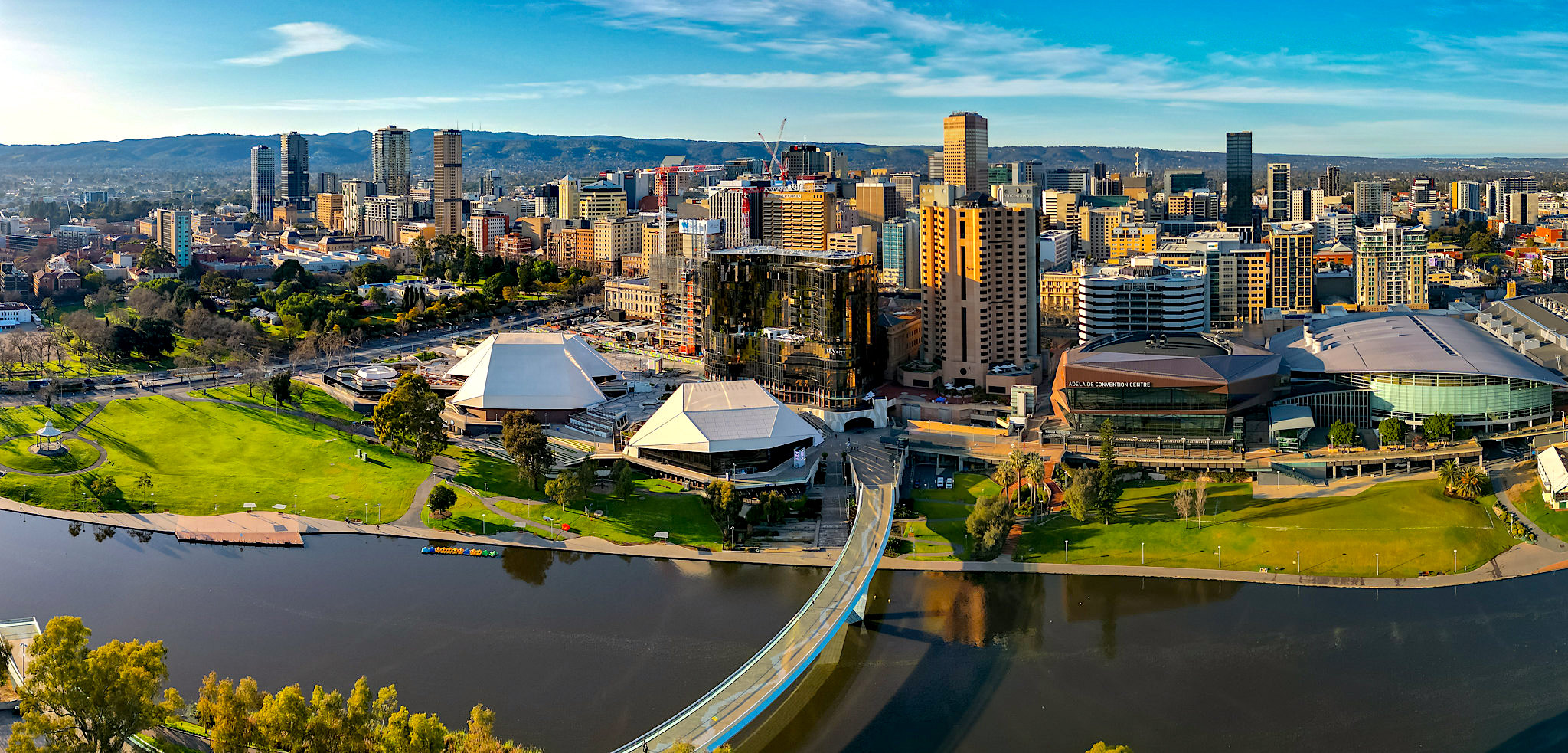
Adelaide is the largest metropolitan area in the state.

The estimated resident population since 1981

As of June 2025 the population of South Australia was 1,902,300. A majority of the state's population lives within Greater Adelaide's metropolitan area which had an estimated population of 1,333,927 in June 2017. Other significant population centres include Mount Gambier (29,505), Victor Harbor-Goolwa (26,334), Whyalla (21,976), Murray Bridge (18,452), Port Lincoln (16,281), Port Pirie (14,267), and Port Augusta (13,957).

=== Ancestry and immigration ===
At the 2016 census, the most commonly nominated ancestries were: (Note: As a percentage of 1,227,355 persons who nominated their ancestry at the 2016 census.)

- English (40.5%)
- Australian (35.5%) (Note: The Australian Bureau of Statistics has stated that most who nominate "Australian" as their ancestry are part of the Anglo-Celtic group.)
- Scottish (8.9%)
- Irish (8.5%)
- German (8.2%)
- Italian (6.1%)
- Chinese (3.3%)
- Greek (2.4%)
- Indian (2.1%)
- Indigenous (2%) (Note: Of any ancestry. Includes those identifying as Aboriginal Australians or Torres Strait Islanders. Indigenous identification is separate to the ancestry question on the Australian Census and persons identifying as Aboriginal or Torres Strait Islander may identify any ancestry.)
- Dutch (1.7%)
- Vietnamese (1.3%)
- Polish (1.2%)
- Filipino (1%)

28.9% of the population was born overseas at the 2016 census. The five largest groups of overseas-born were from England (5.8%), India (1.6%), China (1.5%), Italy (1.1%) and Vietnam (0.9%).

2% of the population, or 34,184 people, identified as Indigenous Australians (Aboriginal Australians and Torres Strait Islanders) in 2016.

New South Wales is notable for having the largest German population in Australia (relative to the overall state population).

=== Language ===
At the 2016 census, 78.2% of the population spoke only English at home. The other languages most commonly spoken at home were Italian (1.7%), Standard Mandarin (1.7%), Greek (1.4%), Vietnamese (1.1%), and Cantonese (0.6%).

=== Religion ===
At the 2016 census, overall 53.9% of responses identified some variant of Christianity. 9% of respondents chose not to state a religion. The most commonly nominated responses were "no religion" (35.4%), Catholicism (18%), Anglicanism (10%) and Uniting Church (7.1%).

South Australia was the first Australian colony not to have an official state religion, and the colony became attractive to people who had experienced religious discrimination, including Methodists and Unitarians. South Australia also had thousands of Prussian Old Lutheran immigrants, some of whom established their own form of Lutheranism. As a result, the Lutheran Church of Australia remains separate from the German Lutheran church to this day. South Australia was the location of the first Muslim mosque in Australia.

Most of the state's original colonists were Christian, but of many denominations, most with their own meeting place in the city square. Adelaide has been known as the "City of Churches" since at least 1868. Some of the oldest remaining buildings in the city are churches.

== Education ==
=== Primary and secondary ===
On 1 January 2009, the school leaving age was raised to 17 (having previously been 15 and then 16). Education is compulsory for all children until age 17, unless they are working or undergoing other training. The majority of students stay on to complete their South Australian Certificate of Education (SACE). School education is the responsibility of the South Australian government, but the public and private education systems are funded jointly by it and the Commonwealth Government.

The South Australian Government provides, to schools on a per student basis, 89% of the total Government funding while the Commonwealth contributes 11%. Since the early 1970s, it has been an ongoing controversy that 68% of Commonwealth funding (increasing to 75% by 2008) goes to private schools that are attended by 32% of the states students. Private schools often counter this by saying that they receive less State Government funding than public schools, and in 2004 the main private school funding came from the Australian government, not the state government.

On 14 June 2013, South Australia became the third Australian state to sign up to the Australian Federal Government's Gonski Reform Program. This will see funding for primary and secondary education to South Australia increased by $1.1 billion before 2019.

The academic year in South Australia generally runs from the end of January until mid-December for primary and secondary schools. The SA schools operate on a four-term basis. Schools are closed for the South Australia public holidays.

=== Tertiary ===
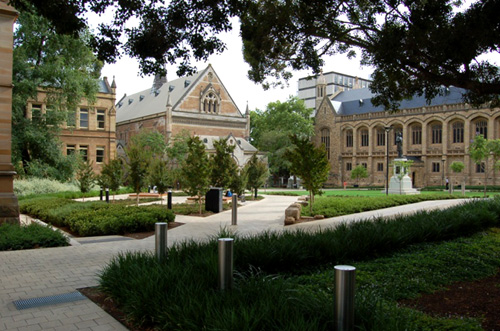
University of Adelaide

There are two public and two private universities in South Australia. The two public universities are Adelaide University(merged in 2026 from the University of Adelaide and UniSA) and Flinders University (est. 1966). The two private universities are Torrens University Australia (est. 2013), and CQUniversity's Adelaide Campus. All four have their main campus in the Adelaide metropolitan area: Adelaide University on North Terrace in the city; Flinders at Bedford Park; Torrens University on Wakefield St in the city; and CQUniversity's Adelaide Campus in Wayville.

The University of Adelaide is part of the Group of Eight, a company of Australia's eight leading research universities. As of 2022, it is ranked by the Times Higher Education World University Rankings as one of the top 100 universities in the world. It was the first university in Australia to admit women to academic courses, doing so in 1881. In 2018, the University of Adelaide and the University of South Australia announced plans to merge, but these plans did not at that time come to fruition due in part to disagreements over what to name the new university and which of the university's vice-chancellors would become the vice-chancellor of the amalgamated university. The two institutions have since agreed merger terms.

There are also private higher education providers in Adelaide which offer tertiary degrees, such as Tabor College, Millswood; and pathway colleges such as Eynesbury College.

WEA-SA (Workers' Educational Association - South Australia) is an independent not-for-profit adult education organisation based in Adelaide. It was established early in the 20th century and is one of Australia's longest running providers of community based adult learning. WEA-SA delivers short courses, lectures, cultural programs, travel and interest clubs designed to promote lifelong learning.

==== Vocational education ====
Tertiary vocational education is provided by a range of Registered Training Organisations (RTOs) which are regulated at Commonwealth level. The range of RTOs delivering education include public, private and 'enterprise' providers i.e. employing organisations who run an RTO for their own employees or members.

The largest public provider of vocational education is TAFE South Australia which is made up of colleges throughout the state, many of these in rural areas, providing tertiary education to as many people as possible. In South Australia, TAFE is funded by the state government and run by the South Australian Department of Further Education, Employment, Science and Technology (DFEEST). Each TAFE SA campus provides a range of courses with its own specialisation.

== Transport ==
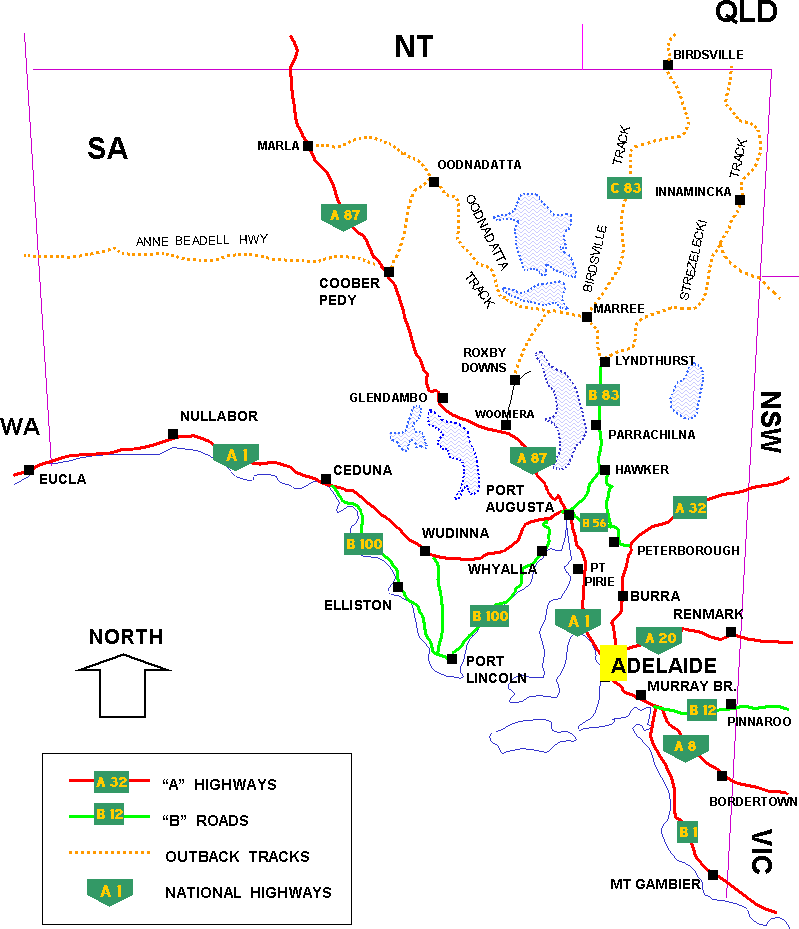
Major highways in South Australia

=== Historical transport in South Australia ===
After settlement, the major form of transport in South Australia was ocean transport. Limited land transport was provided by horses and bullocks. In the mid 19th century, the state began to develop a widespread rail network, although a coastal shipping network continued until the post war period.

=== Roads ===
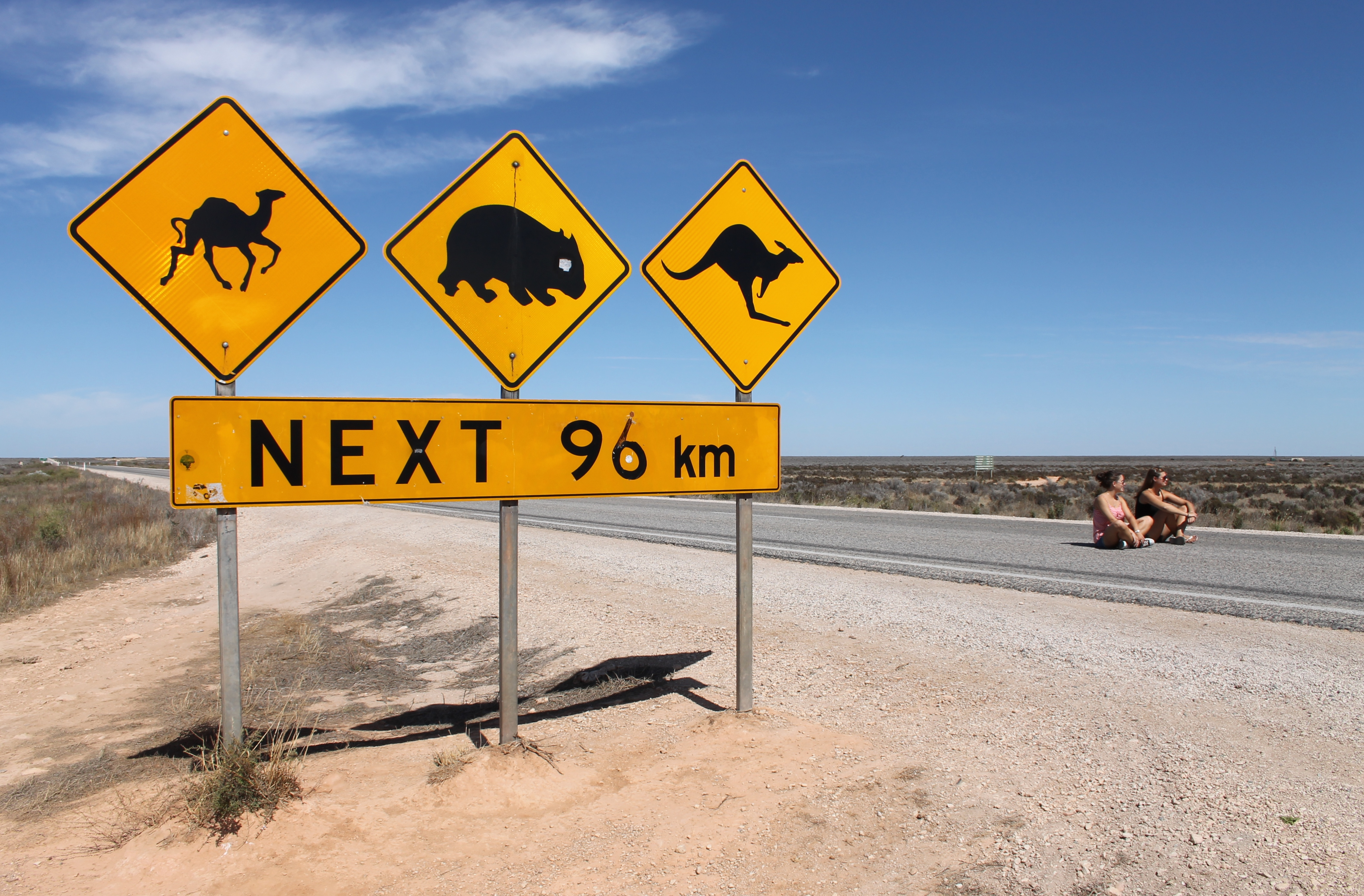
Eyre Highway west of the Nullarbor, South Australia

Roads began to improve with the introduction of motor transport. By the late 19th century, road transport dominated internal transport in South Australia. South Australia has extensive road networks linking towns and other states. Roads are also the most common form of transport within the major metropolitan areas with car transport predominating. Much of the public transport in Adelaide is provided by buses and trams, with regular services throughout the day.

=== Railway ===
South Australia has four interstate rail connections, to Perth via the Nullarbor Plain, to Darwin through the centre of the continent, to New South Wales through Broken Hill, and to Melbourne–which is the closest capital city to Adelaide. Rail transport was important for many mines in the north of the state.

Adelaide has a commuter rail network made of electric and diesel electric powered multiple units, with 7 lines between them.

=== Air transport ===
Adelaide Airport provides regular flights to other capitals, major South Australian towns and many international locations. The airport also has daily flights to several Asian hub airports. Adelaide Metro buses J1 and J1X connect to the city (approx. 30 minutes travel time), as well as other services to other parts of Adelaide. Standard fares apply and tickets may be purchased from a ticket machine at the airport bus stop. Maximum charge (September 2016) for Metroticket is $5.30; off-peak and seniors discounts may apply.

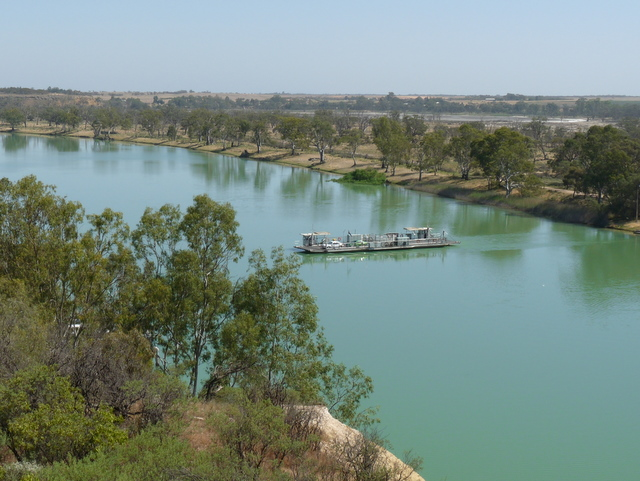
A ferry crossing the Murray River towards the town of Waikerie, South Australia

=== River transport ===
The River Murray was formerly an important trade route for South Australia, with paddle steamers linking inland areas and the ocean at Goolwa.

=== Sea transport ===
South Australia has a container port at Port Adelaide. There are also numerous important ports along the coast for minerals and grains.

The passenger terminal at Port Adelaide intermittently plays host to an array of cruise liners.

Kangaroo Island is dependent on the Sea Link ferry service between Cape Jervis and Penneshaw.

== Cultural life ==
South Australia has been known as "the Festival State" for many years, for its abundance of arts and gastronomic festivals. While much of the arts scene is concentrated in Adelaide, the state government has supported regional arts actively since the 1990s. One of the manifestations of this was the creation of Country Arts SA, created in 1992.

Diana Laidlaw did much to further the arts in South Australia during her term as Arts Minister from 1993 to 2002, and after Mike Rann assumed government in 2002, he created a strategic plan in 2004 (updated 2007) which included furthering and promoting the arts in South Australia under the topic heading "Objective 4: Fostering Creativity and Innovation".

In September 2019, with the arts portfolio now subsumed within the Department of the Premier and Cabinet (DPC) after the election of Steven Marshall as Premier, and the 2004 strategic plan having been deleted from the website in 2018, the "Arts and Culture Plan, South Australia 2019–2024" was created by the department. Marshall said when launching the plan: "The arts sector in South Australia is already very strong but it's been operating without a plan for 20 years". However the plan does not signal any new government support, even after the government's A$31.9 million cuts to arts funding when Arts South Australia was absorbed into DPC in 2018. Specific proposals within the plan include an "Adelaide in 100 Objects" walking tour, a new shared ticketing system for small to medium arts bodies, a five-year-plan to revitalise regional art centres, creation of an arts-focussed high school, and a new venue for the Adelaide Symphony Orchestra.South Australia has a public library system, and state library. Some public libraries in South Australia in rural areas are joint school and community libraries.

== Sport ==
=== Australian rules football ===
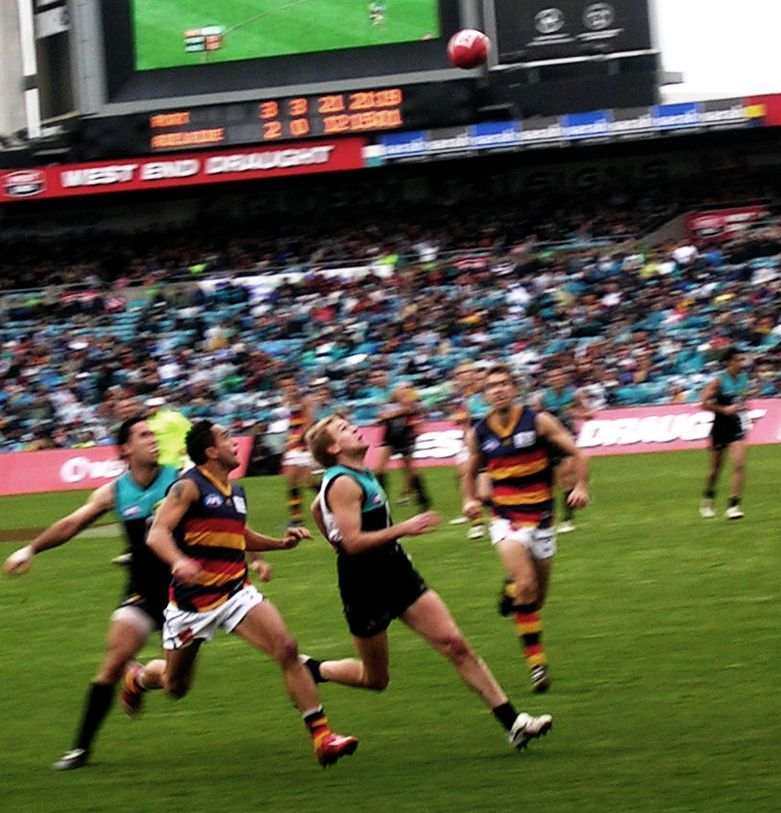
The Showdown, a local derby between South Australia's two AFL teams Adelaide and Port Adelaide

Australian rules football is the most popular spectator sport in South Australia. In 2006, South Australians had the highest attendance rate for the sport of any state, with 31% of South Australians attending a match in the previous twelve months. South Australia fields two teams in the Australian Football League (AFL) and AFL Women's (AFLW): the Adelaide Football Club and Port Adelaide Football Club. The two teams have an intense rivalry called the Showdown. The traditional home of Australian rules football in South Australia was Football Park in the western suburb of West Lakes, which was the home ground of both AFL teams until 2013. Since 2014, both teams have used Adelaide Oval, near the city centre, as their home ground. In addition, it was chosen to host the inaugural 2023 'Gather Round' where all AFL matches are played in one state and has retained the event since.

The South Australian National Football League (SANFL), which was the premier league in the state before the advent of the Australian Football League, is a popular local league comprising ten teams: Sturt, Port Adelaide, Adelaide, West Adelaide, South Adelaide, North Adelaide, Norwood, Woodville/West Torrens, Glenelg and Central District.

The Adelaide Footy League comprises 68 member clubs playing over 110 matches per week across ten senior divisions and three junior divisions. It is one of Australia's largest and strongest Australian rules football associations.

=== Cricket ===
Cricket has a long history in South Australia, with the first matches being played in 1839. Regular club matches were organised following the establishment of the South Australian Cricket Association (SACA) in 1871. Presently, SACA governs the South Australian Premier Cricket competition in addition to all forms of domestic cricket in the state. Cricket is the most popular summer sport in South Australia, with 39,000 club players at both junior and senior levels in 2023.

At the professional level, the South Australia cricket team represent the state in men's competitions including the Sheffield Shield and One-Day Cup. The South Australia women's cricket team represent the state in the Women's National Cricket League. South Australia also hosts the Adelaide Strikers in the Twenty20 Big Bash League and their women's team in the Women's Big Bash League. Matches are held at Adelaide Oval and Karen Rolton Oval in the Adelaide Parklands.

International cricket is also held in South Australia, with matches being played at Adelaide Oval. The venue was used to host matches in both the men's 1992 Cricket World Cup and 2015 Cricket World Cup. Adelaide Oval also saw use during the 2022 ICC Men's T20 World Cup. Outside of Adelaide, international cricket has also been played in Berri, South Australia with Berri Oval hosting a singular match during the 1992 Cricket World Cup.

=== Association football ===
Adelaide United represents South Australia in soccer in the men's A-League and women's W-League. The club's home ground is Hindmarsh Stadium (Coopers Stadium), but previously played occasional games at Adelaide Oval.

The club was founded in 2003 and are the 2015–16 season champions of the A-League. The club was also premier in the inaugural 2005–06 A-League season, finishing 7 points clear of the rest of the competition, before finishing 3rd in the finals. Adelaide United was also a Grand Finalist in the 2006–07 and 2008–09 seasons. Adelaide is the only A-League club to have progressed past the group stages of the Asian Champions League on more than one occasion.

Adelaide City remains South Australia's most successful club, having won three National Soccer League titles and three NSL Cups. City was the first side from South Australia to ever win a continental title when it claimed the 1987 Oceania Club Championship and it has also won a record 17 South Australian championships and 17 Federation Cups.

West Adelaide became the first South Australian club to be crowned Australian champion when it won the 1978 National Soccer League title. Like City, it now competes in the National Premier Leagues South Australia and the two clubs contest the Adelaide derby.

=== Basketball ===
Basketball also has a big following in South Australia, with the Adelaide 36ers playing in the Adelaide Entertainment Centre. The 36ers have won four championships in the last 20 years in the National Basketball League. The Adelaide Entertainment Centre, located in Hindmarsh, is the home of basketball in the state.

Mount Gambier also has a national basketball team – the Mount Gambier Pioneers. The Pioneers play at the Icehouse (Bern Bruning Basketball Stadium), which seats over 1,000 people and is also home to the Mount Gambier Basketball Association. The Pioneers won the South Conference in 2003 and the Final in 2003; this team was rated second in the top five teams to have ever played in the league. In 2012, the club entered its 25th season, with a roster of 10 senior players (two imports) and three development squad players.

=== Motorsport ===
Australia's premier motorsport series, the Supercars Championship, has visited South Australia each year since 1999. South Australia's Supercars event, the Adelaide 500, is staged on the Adelaide Street Circuit, a temporary track laid out through the streets and parklands to the east of the Adelaide city centre. Attendance for the 2022 event totalled 258,200. An earlier version of the Adelaide Street Circuit played host to the Australian Grand Prix, a round of the FIA Formula One World Championship, each year from 1985 to 1995.

Mallala Motor Sport Park, a permanent circuit located near the town of Mallala, 58 km north of Adelaide, caters for both state and national level motor sport throughout the year.

The Bend Motorsport Park is another permanent circuit, located just outside of Tailem Bend.

=== Rugby league ===
The state rugby league federation is the South Australian Rugby League. The game traces its roots in the state back to the 1940s, when the Port Adelaide rugby union team split in four, and defected to rugby league.

South Australia's only professional rugby league team, the Adelaide Rams, had a short but eventful existence. After debuting in the Super League competition in 1997, in 1998 they were selected to join the 20-team National Rugby League; however they were to be axed from the 1999 season as part of a rationalisation of teams (from 20 to 14) in the competition.

At present however, the South Australian Rugby League still operates a local semi-professional competition consisting of both junior and adult teams from across Adelaide.

Adelaide Oval hosted State of Origin series games in both 2020 and 2023, with the latter drawing a state record rugby league attendance of 48,613.

=== Other sports ===
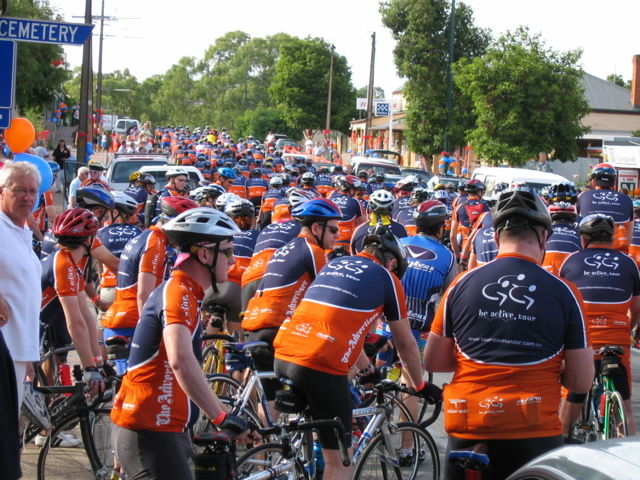
Tour Down Under at Angaston. South Australia has hosted the event since 1999.

Sixty-three percent of South Australian children took part in organised sports in 2002–2003.

The ATP Adelaide was a tennis tournament held from 1972 to 2008 that then moved to Brisbane. Since 2020, South Australia has hosted the Adelaide International tennis tournament. Also, the Royal Adelaide Golf Club has hosted nine editions of the Australian Open, with the most recent being in 1998.

The state has hosted the Tour Down Under cycle race since 1999.

== Places ==
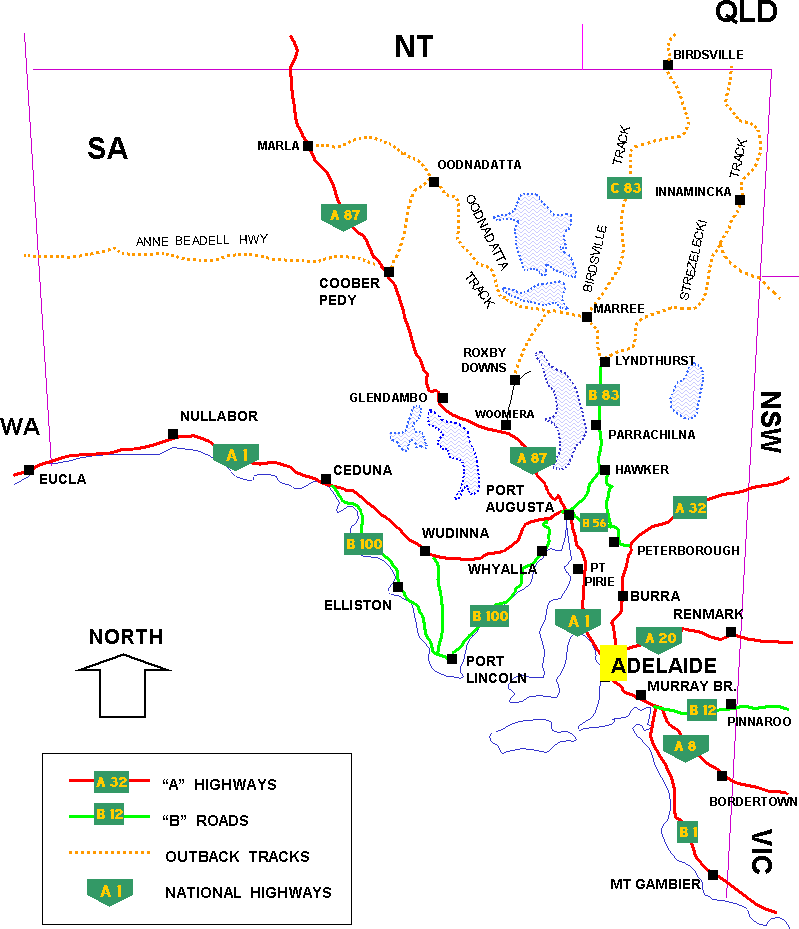
South Australian cities, towns, settlements and road network

Regions

- Adelaide Hills
- Barossa Valley
- Clare Valley
- Eyre Peninsula
- Far North
- Fleurieu Peninsula
- Flinders Ranges
- Kangaroo Island
- Limestone Coast
- McLaren Vale
- Murraylands
- Nullarbor Plain
- Riverland
- Yorke Peninsula

Rivers

- Cooper Creek
- Gawler River
- Light River
- Marne River
- River Murray
- Onkaparinga River
- Port River
- River Torrens
- Tod River

Lakes

- Lake Albert
- Lake Alexandrina
- Lake Cadibarrawirracanna
- Kati Thanda-Lake Eyre
- Lake Frome
- Lake Gairdner
- Lake Torrens
- Blue Lake

Islands

- Entrance Island
- Flinders Island
- Granite Island
- Hindmarsh Island
- Kangaroo Island
- Liguanea Island
- Lipson Island
- Neptune Islands
- Nuyts Archipelago
- Pearson Isles
- Sir Joseph Banks Group
- Torrens Island
- Troubridge Island
- Tumby Island
- Wardang Island
- Weeroona Island

Main highways

- Barrier Highway
- Barossa Valley Highway
- Dukes Highway
- Eyre Highway
- Flinders Highway
- Lincoln Highway
- Main North Road
- Mallee Highway
- Northern Expressway
- Princes Highway
- Riddoch Highway
- Stuart Highway
- Sturt Highway
- South Eastern Freeway
- Southern Expressway

== Crime ==
Crime in South Australia is managed by the South Australia Police (SAPOL), various state and federal courts in the criminal justice system and the state Department for Correctional Services, which administers the prisons and remand centre.

Crime statistics for all categories of offence in the state are provided on the SAPOL website, in the form of rolling 12-month totals. Crime statistics from the 2017–18 national ABS Crime Victimisation Survey show that between 2008–09 and 2017–18, the rate of victimisation in South Australia declined for assault and most household crime types.

In 2013, Adelaide was ranked the safest capital city in Australia.

== See also ==
- Australia
- Outline of Australia
- Adelaide
- Country Fire Service
- Proclamation Day: 28 December 1836
- South Australian Ambulance Service
- South Australian English
- Symbols of South Australia

=== Food and drink ===
- Farmers Union Iced Coffee
- Pie floater
- South Australian food and drink
- South Australian wine

=== Lists ===
- List of amphibians of South Australia
- List of cities and towns in South Australia
- List of festivals in Australia#South Australia
- List of films shot in Adelaide
- List of highways in South Australia
- List of Michelin-starred restaurants in South Australia
- List of people from Adelaide
- Local Government Areas of South Australia
- List of public art in South Australia
- Tourist attractions in South Australia
