= Coat of arms of South Australia =

State Coat of Arms of South Australia

Versions
- State Badge of South Australia
- Adopted: 1984
- Crest: Four Sturt's Desert Peas
- Torse: Or, gules, and azure
- Shield: Azure; a circle or representing the rising sun with an Australian Piping Shrike displayed and standing on the staff of a Gum Tree proper
- Supporters: None
- Compartment: A grassy mount with two Vines growing from it, each entwining their stakes; on either side of the shield stalks of Wheat and Barley; on the dexter (viewer's left) scattered with Citrus Fruits; and lying on the sinister side (viewer's right) two Cog Wheels with a Miner's Pick between them
- Motto: South Australia

The coat of arms of South Australia is an official symbol of the state of South Australia. It was granted by Queen Elizabeth II on 19 April 1984. They replaced a coat of arms granted to the State in 1936 by King Edward VIII.

The shield has the piping shrike within a golden disc (representing the rising sun) on a blue background. The piping shrike is the unofficial bird emblem of South Australia and also appears on the state badge. The crest is the Sturt's desert pea, the floral emblem of South Australia, on top of a wreath of the state colours. The coat of arms has no supporters, but a 1984 proposal showed koala and wombat supporters. The compartment, or base, is a grassland with symbols of agriculture and industry, and a motto with the name "South Australia".

== Historical arms ==
The former South Australian coat of arms, used between 1936 and 1984.

The proposed coat of arms of South Australia from 1984

== See also ==
- Flag of South Australia
- Government of South Australia
- Australian heraldry
