= List of public art in South Australia =

This is a list of public art in South Australia organized by town. This list is focused only on outdoor public art, and thus does not encompass works contained within private collections, art galleries or museums.

== Adelaide ==
Title	Artist	Year	Location	Material	Image
Alice	John Dowie	1962	Rymill Gardens	Bronze	Bronze statue of a girl, apparently twirling about; the pedestal is decorated with characters from the "Alice" books by Lewis Carroll
Alice, of the Lewis Carroll books, is located in Rymill Gardens, near East Terrace. The pedestal is decorated on each face with a row of characters from the books, as imagined by John Tennie. The work was commissioned by Josephine and Norman Lewis.					Bronze statue of a girl, apparently twirling about; the pedestal is decorated with characters from the "Alice" books by Lewis Carroll
34°55′27.48″S 138°36′46.8″E					Bronze statue of a girl, apparently twirling about; the pedestal is decorated with characters from the "Alice" books by Lewis Carroll
A Day Out	Marguerite Derricourt	1999	Rundle Mall	Bronze	3D version of this picture
A Day Out consists of four bronze pigs, each depicted as if they were exploring the city. Located in Rundle Mall and commissioned by the Adelaide City Council, the pigs are named Truffles, Horatio, Oliver and Augusta. A Day Out was unveiled on 3 July 1999.					3D version of this picture
34°55′22.66″S 138°36′1.02″E					3D version of this picture
Girl on a Slide	John Dowie	1977	Rundle Mall	Bronze	a bronze statue of a girl, arms and legs extended, sliding downwards on a 30-degree slope
The Life of Stars	Lindy Lee		Art Gallery of South Australia	stainless steel, highly polished	Tall egg-shaped monument made from stainless steel sheet, with thousands of perforations of various sizes.
Tall perforated egg made from stainless steel sheet, polished to mirror finish; located near the entrance to the Art Gallery of South Australia.					Tall egg-shaped monument made from stainless steel sheet, with thousands of perforations of various sizes.
34°55′15.58″S 138°36′13.59″E					Tall egg-shaped monument made from stainless steel sheet, with thousands of perforations of various sizes.
Old Dog	Craige Andrae	2010	Franklin Street		3D version of this picture
"'Old Dog'" was first installed on Union Street in the city, but was subsequently moved to its current location on the corner of Franklin and Bowen streets, just outside the Adelaide Central bus station.					3D version of this picture
34°55′39.27″S 138°35′42.85″E					3D version of this picture
Paper Bag	Michelle Nikou	2013	North Terrace	Bronze	3D version of this picture
A life-size paper bag in bronze, this was Michelle Nikou's response to the bronze busts along North Terrace.					3D version of this picture
34°55′15.72″S 138°36′11.64″E					3D version of this picture
Paving Art Rundle St	Michelle Nikou	2006	Rundle Street	Gold and Silver Coins embedded in Concrete	About 30 coins from various countries embedded into the footpath of Rundle Street, Adelaide
Located on both sides of Rundle Street, this work consists of thousands of random coins from around the world and Australia, embedded in concrete pavers.					About 30 coins from various countries embedded into the footpath of Rundle Street, Adelaide
Progress	Lyndon Dadswell	1959	Rundle Mall	Copper	View of the spirit of Progress on the marble wall of the old David Jones building
Progress was designed by Lyndon Dadswell, who was regarded as one of Australia's most accomplished sculptors. The work represents the "spirit of progress", and is situated on what was for many years the David Jones building in Rundle Mall, having been installed in 1963 – four years after the work was completed. Dadswell studied for a time under Rayner Hoff, noted in Adelaide as the sculptor for the South Australian National War Memorial.					View of the spirit of Progress on the marble wall of the old David Jones building
34°55′22.12″S 138°36′6.31″E					View of the spirit of Progress on the marble wall of the old David Jones building
Robert Burns	William J. Maxwell	1894	North Terrace	Angaston white marble	Close-up shot of the Robert Burns statue
Robert Burns was commissioned by the Adelaide Caledonian Society and represents the poet reading his poem Winter's Night before a literary gathering at the Duchess of Gordon's in 1787, taken from a painting by Charles Martin Hardie (1858–1916) in the possession of Mrs. R. Barr Smith. Sir Thomas Elder contributed significantly towards its £1,000 cost. The unveiling was held on 5 May 1894.					Close-up shot of the Robert Burns statue
Roy "Mo" Rene	Robert Hannaford	2010	Hindley Street	Bronze	3D version of this picture
Roy "Mo" Rene was commissioned by Adelaide City Council to remember the vaudeville and radio star, Roy Rene, who was born not far from where the statue is now located. Created by Robert Hannaford and cast in bronze, the work is posed and positioned in order to encourage passers-by to be photographed with "Mo".					3D version of this picture
34°55′23.37″S 138°35′52.07″E					3D version of this picture
South African War Memorial	Adrian Jones	1904	Corner of King William Street and North Terrace	Bronze	Detail shot of the South African War Memorial, from below and to the front.
The South African War Memorial was the second public equestrian statue to be unveiled in Australia. Designed by Adrian Jones and commissioned to commemorate the South Australians who served in the Second Boer War, it was unveiled in 1904. The granite pedestal upon which it stands was designed by Garlick, Sibley and Wooldridge.					Detail shot of the South African War Memorial, from below and to the front.
34°55′17.45″S 138°35′58.06″E					Detail shot of the South African War Memorial, from below and to the front.
Spheres	Bert Flugelman	1977	Rundle Mall	Stainless steel	3D version of this picture
Originally dubbed On Further Reflection, and affectionately referred to as the "Mall's Balls", Spheres was commissioned by the Hindmarsh Building Society, who donated the work to the Adelaide City Council in 1977. It has become one of Adelaide's most recognisable artworks.					3D version of this picture
34°55′22.12″S 138°36′11.64″E					3D version of this picture
Tetrahedra (Festival Sculpture)	Bert Flugelman	1974	Adelaide Festival Centre, plaza	Stainless steel	3D version of this picture
Untitled	Paul Trappe	1979	Hindmarsh Square	Granite	3D version of this picture
Untitled granite sculpture by Paul Trappe, located in Hindmarsh Square, Adelaide.					3D version of this picture
34°55′25.66″S 138°36′21.38″E					3D version of this picture
Untitled	Ulrich Ruckriem	1986	Art Gallery of South Australia	Granite	3D version of this picture
Untitled granite sculpture by Ulrich Ruckriem, located near the northern wall of the Art Gallery of South Australia. Carved on site.					3D version of this picture
34°55′11.42″S 138°36′14.65″E					3D version of this picture
Venere Di Canova	Copied from work by Antonio Canova	1892	North Terrace	Marble	3D version of this picture
Adelaide's first public statue, the Venere Di Canova was donated to the city by W A Horn in 1892.					3D version of this picture
34°55.277′S 138°35.032′E					3D version of this picture

== Kapunda ==
Title	Artist	Year	Location	Material	Image
Map the Miner	Ben van Zetten	1988	Gawler Road	Fibreglass over steel frame	Map the Miner at Kapunda

== Port Noarlunga ==
Title	Artist	Year	Location	Material	Image
Core Values	Terry Beaston	2013	Port Noarlunga	Cast cement, glass, ceramic, coloured oxides	

== See also ==
- List of public art in Western Australia
- Australia's big things
