= List of electoral divisions in South Australia =

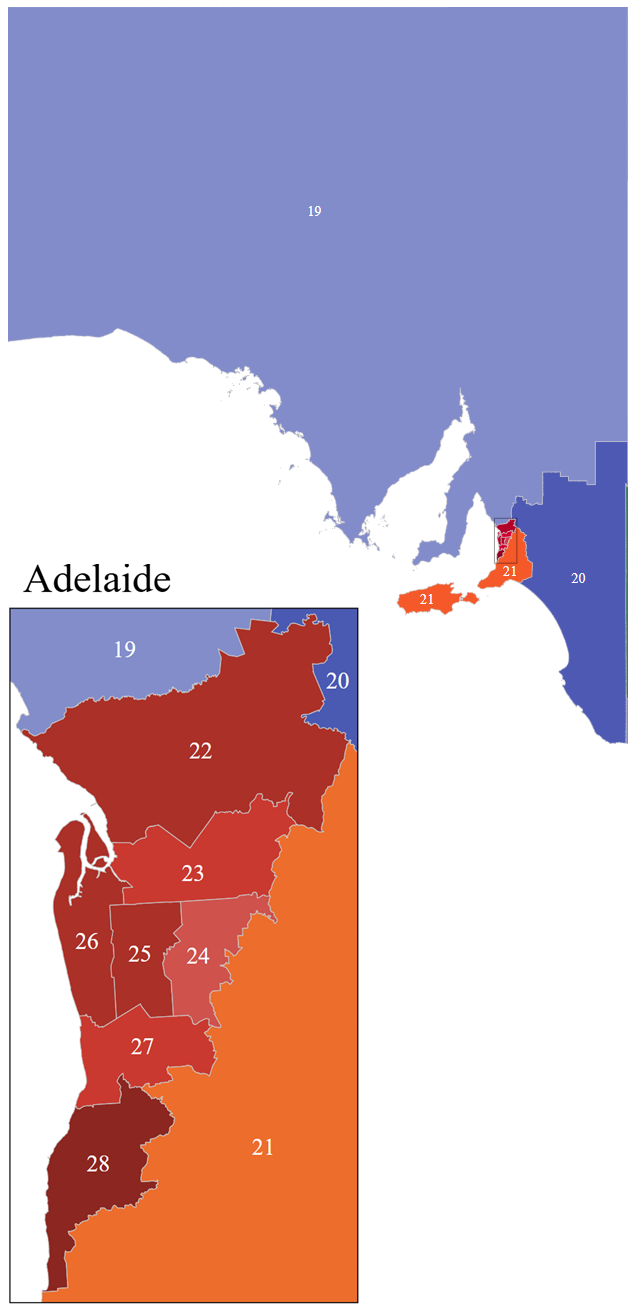
Results of the 2025 federal election

The Australian state of South Australia is divided into 10 electoral divisions for the purposes of electing the Australian House of Representatives. At the 2025 federal election, the Australian Labor Party won 7 seats, the Liberal Party of Australia won 2 seats, and 1 seat was won by the Centre Alliance.

== Divisions ==
Name	Formed	Size (km^{2})	Classification	Current Member	Member's Party	Reference
Adelaide	1903	86 (2025)	Inner-metropolitan	Steve Georganas	Labor	
Barker	1903	65,206 (2025)	Rural	Tony Pasin	Liberal	
Boothby	1903	115 (2025)	Outer-metropolitan	Louise Miller-Frost	Labor	
Grey / O'Donoghue	1903; 2026	908,595 (2025)	Rural	Tom Venning	Liberal	
Hindmarsh	1903	122 (2025)	Inner-metropolitan	Mark Butler	Labor	
Kingston	1949	165 (2025)	Outer-metropolitan	Amanda Rishworth	Labor	
Makin	1984	162 (2025)	Outer-metropolitan	Tony Zappia	Labor	
Mayo	1984	9,135 (2025)	Rural	Rebekha Sharkie	Centre Alliance	
Spence	2019	532 (2025)	Outer-metropolitan	Matt Burnell	Labor	
Sturt	1949	97 (2025)	Inner-metropolitan	Claire Clutterham	Labor	

== See also ==
- Parliament of South Australia
