= Flag of South Australia =

Australian state flag

South Australia
- Use: Civil and state flag
- Proportion: 1:2
- Adopted: 1904; 122 years ago
- Design: A British blue ensign with the state badge in the fly

The current state flag of South Australia, was officially adopted in 1904.

The flag is based on the defaced British Blue Ensign with the state badge located in the fly. The badge is a gold disc featuring a piping shrike with its wings outstretched. The badge is believed to have been originally designed by Robert Craig, a teacher at the School of Arts in Adelaide, and officially gazetted on 14 January 1904.

== Design ==
The flag uses the same basic template as the flag of every other Australian state, a blue field with the Union Jack on the canton and a unique design on the fly. In this case, the seal is a yellow disc, representing the sun, with a piping shrike perched on a eucalyptus tree branch. The Piping Shrike is more commonly known as a White-backed Magpie.

=== Colours ===
Scheme	Blue	White	Red	Yellow
Pantone (paper)	295 C	Safe	199 C	137 C
HEX	#002855	#FFFFFF	#D50032	#FFCA00
CMYK	100, 53, 0, 67	0, 0, 0, 0	0, 100, 77, 16	0, 21, 100, 0
RGB	0, 40, 85	255, 255, 255	214, 0, 49	255, 201, 0

== History ==
Flag between 1870–1876

Flag between 1876–1904

=== Previous flags ===
The first flag of South Australia was adopted in 1870. It too was a defaced British Blue Ensign but with a black disc in the fly containing the Southern Cross and the two pointers (Alpha and Beta Centauri).

South Australia then adopted a second flag in 1876, also a Blue Ensign, with a new badge. The badge design was an artistic rendition of the arrival of Britannia (a white woman in flowing garb and holding a shield, representing the new settlers) meeting an Aboriginal sitting with a spear on a rocky shoreline. A kangaroo appears to be carved into the rocks behind the Aboriginal. This flag was adopted after a request from the Colonial Office for a new design over the old one due to its similarity to the flags of New Zealand and Victoria.

=== Current design ===
The badge design adopted in 1876 was deemed too complex by some, and a request was sent to Frederick Holder, then the premier of South Australia to make the seal simpler. It was apparently designed by Robert Craig, and featured a yellow disc representing the sun, with a magpie (piping shrike) on top of it. On Wednesday 27 February 1901 the painting by H.P Gill was approved by both the Governor and the Premier of South Australia as the design of the new State Badge for South Australia. The Premier wrote on the back of the painting “Accepted (without pomegranate)”. The Governor wrote the following heraldic description on the back of the painting: “The rising sun – or – Thereon an Australian piping shrike displayed proper – under a pomegranate flower amid leaves and standing on a gum-staff, raguly, gules and vert.” (or = gold, displayed proper = in its natural colours, raguly = with oblique lines, gules = red, vert = green). The Governor removed the reference to the pomegranate, and crossed out gum and changed gum-staff to staff of gum tree. It was adopted on January 13, 1904 and the seal also appears on the Coat of arms of South Australia, which was introduced 80 years later.

Though the state flag was originally intended for use only on government buildings, in 1908 the Government of South Australia began encouraging the use of it by private citizens.

=== Proposal for a new flag ===
On 29 October 2016, a motion to adopt a new, "more multicultural" state flag was passed at the South Australian Labor Party conference. The State Government did not act on this proposal before Labor lost office at the 2018 state election.

== Regulation and use ==
According to section 3A of the Unauthorised Documents Act 1916:

Any person who, without the permission of the Minister—

(a) prints, publishes or manufactures; or
(b) causes to be printed, published or manufactured, any document, material or object incorporating, depicting or in the form of, a prescribed emblem—
(c) for any commercial purpose; and
(d) in such a manner as to suggest that the document, material or object has official significance,

shall be guilty of an offence.

== Governor's flag ==
The governor of South Australia, being the representative of the South Australian head of state, the king of Australia, is officially granted a flag for use on all official occasions. It is identical in design and construction to the flag of South Australia, except that it features a Tudor Crown above the badge to represent vice-regal power.

Standard of the governor 1870–1876

Standard of the governor 1876–1904

Standard of the governor 1904–1975

Standard of the governor 1975–2024

Standard of the governor of South Australia

== See also ==
- Coat of arms of South Australia
- List of Australian flags
- Flags of the governors of the Australian states
