= Piping shrike =

Emblematic bird

Flag of South Australia featuring the piping shrike

The badge on the flag of South Australia depicts the rising sun, and a piping shrike standing on a branch of a gum tree. The piping shrike is more commonly known as a white-backed magpie (Gymnorhina tibicen).

The piping shrike is sometimes mistakenly associated with the magpie-lark (Grallina cyanoleuca), also known as the Murray magpie, pee wee and mudlark. This confusion came about because it is not obvious that the image depicts the back of the bird. The South Australian governor used the term piping shrike for the white-backed magpie in correspondence, and wrote the words "Australian piping shrike" on the back of drawing proposals of the bird for the state badge of South Australia in the early 1900s.

The name piping shrike is closely linked to the early name for the Australian magpie. From the early 1800s, the name piping crow shrike was used for the black-backed magpie, which is the nominate race of the Australian magpie in today's taxonomies. The name that was used for the white-backed magpie, the piping shrike on the state badge, was the white backed crow shrike. Both are in the same species (Australian magpie) in today's taxonomies. A review of newspaper articles from the early 1900s, and the South Australian Bird Protection Act of 1900, show that people were grouping both black-backed magpies and white-backed magpies under the general name “Piping Crow Shrikes”. The Latin name for the white-backed magpie is Gymnorhina tibicen telonocua. Tibicen relates to piping or piper, hence the name piping shrike.

== Origins ==
The piping shrike first appeared on the Governor's ensign in 1903, and was also on the State Badge which was proclaimed in 1904. The original reports credited it to H. P. Gill who was the director of the School of Arts, with some input and critique from the Governor General Hallam Tennyson, 2nd Baron Tennyson. The nephew of Robert Craig of the School of Arts claims that he was solely responsible for the original design. A similar argument is made by the relatives of the Adelaide artist Frances Jane Warhurst who claim that she based it on the eagle on the seal of the Prussian consul, a close friend of hers. There are also reports of a later version also credited to Gill in 1910. The badge design, which set the bird against a backdrop of the yellow risen sun of Australian Federation, was incorporated into the state flag (1904) and the coat of arms (1984).

The name piping shrike was already in colloquial use for the Australian magpie before the governor used it as the official name for the bird on the original painting. An example of the usage of the term piping shrike for the Australian magpie can be seen in a newspaper from 1891.

== Acceptance of The State Badge of South Australia ==
On Wednesday 27 February 1901 the painting by H.P Gill was approved by both the governor and the premier of South Australia as the design of the new state badge for South Australia. The premier wrote on the back of the painting “Accepted (without pomegranate)”. The governor wrote the following heraldic description on the back of the painting:

“The rising sun – or – Thereon an Australian piping shrike displayed proper – under a pomegranate flower amid leaves and standing on a gum-staff, raguly, gules and vert.”

(or gold, displayed proper in its natural colours, raguly with oblique lines, gules with red, and vert with green). The governor removed the reference to the pomegranate, and crossed out gum and changed gum-staff to staff of gum tree.

The viewer sees the back of the bird: this can be confirmed by the position of the bird's tail over the back of the gum-tree branch. The bird's head is turned to its left.

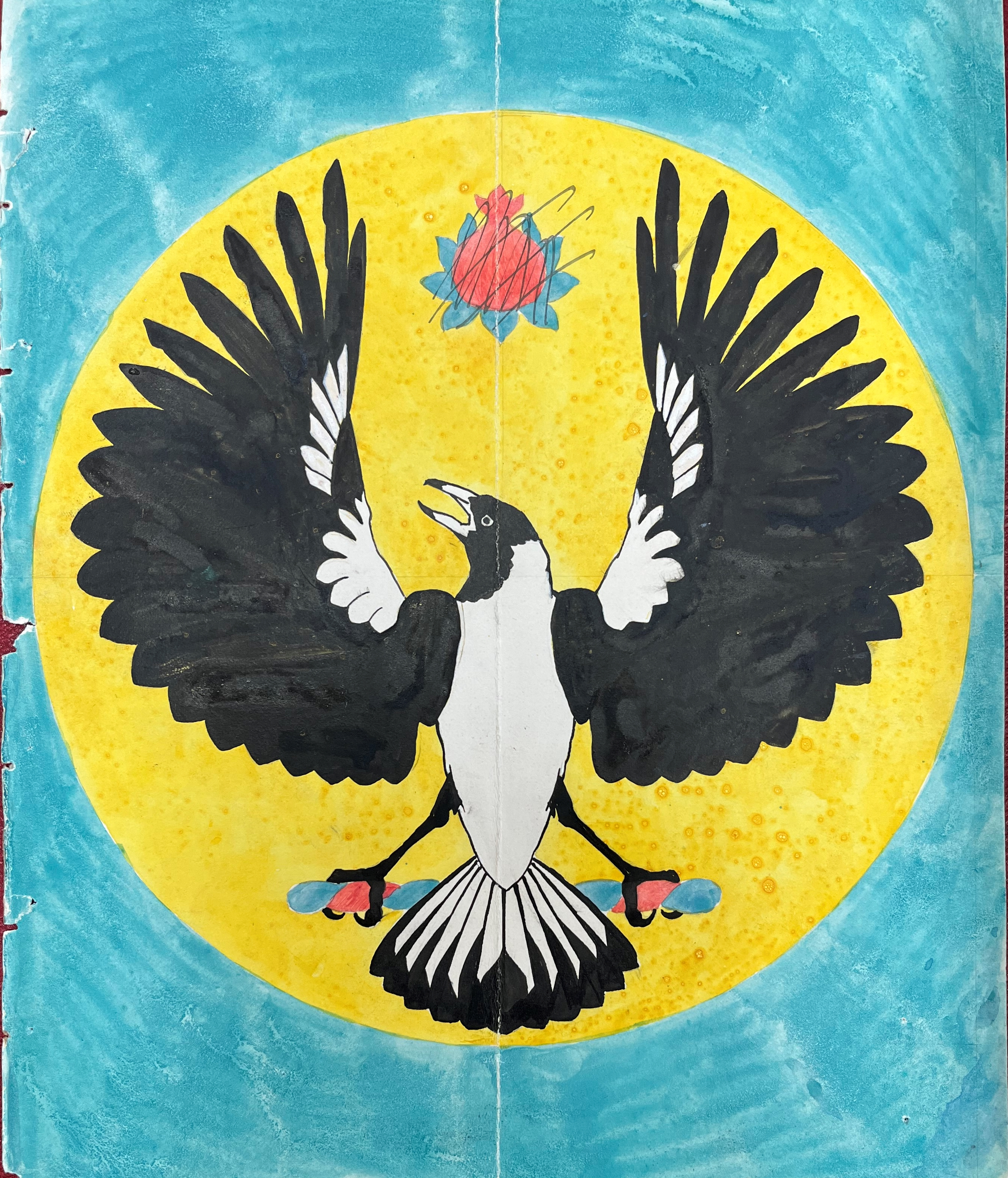
Original painting accepted in 1901 and used for the design of the Seal, Badge and Flag of South Australia

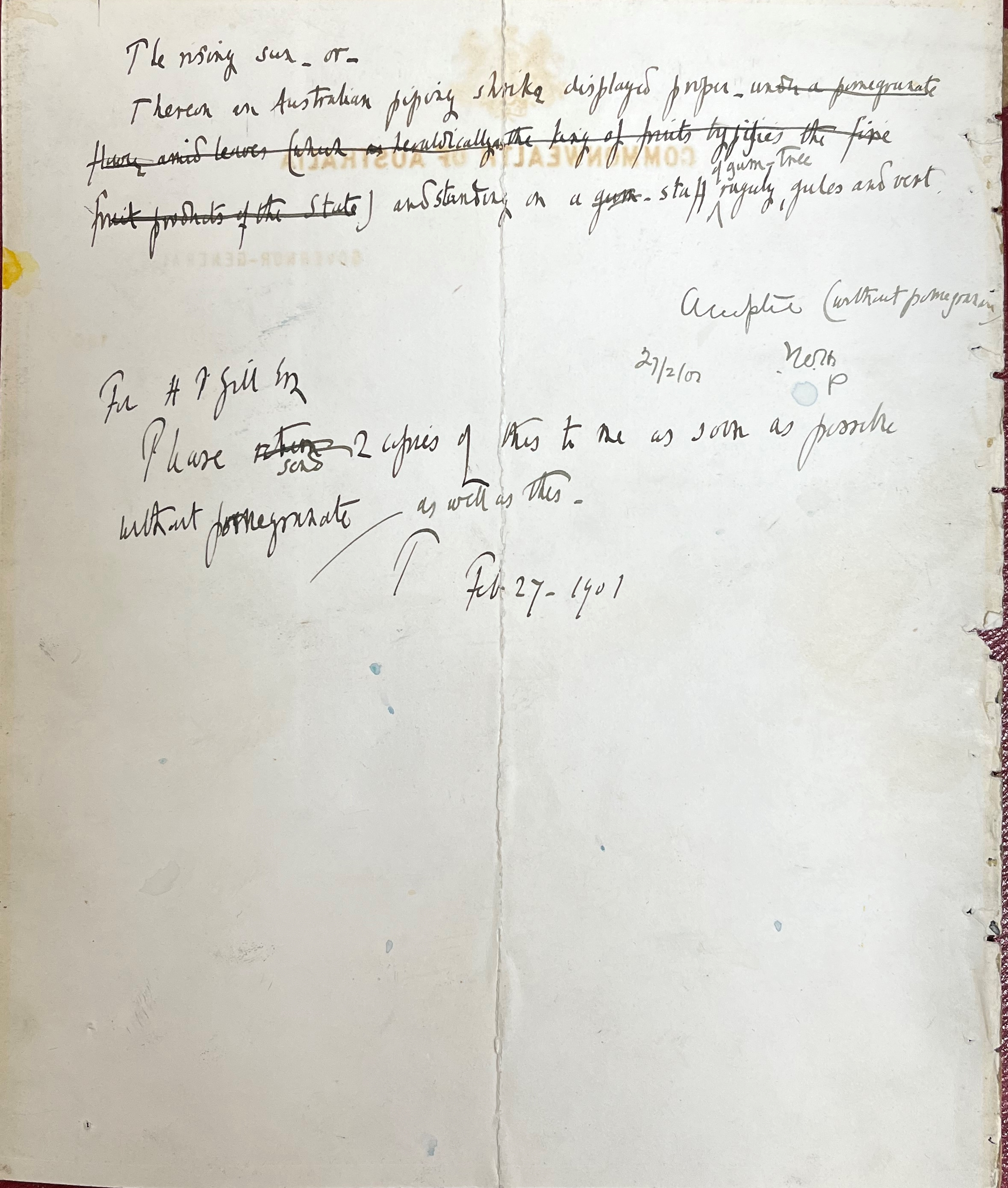
Back of the original painting with notes made by the Governor and the Premier of South Australia, in which The Governor describes the bird as an Australian piping shrike.

== Identification of the bird ==
The original reports state that the piping shrike is the Australian magpie, and government sources specify the subspecies as the white-backed magpie (Gymnorhina tibicen leuconota). The range of the subspecies (Gymnorhina tibicen telonocua) of the Australian magpie is almost entirely confined to South Australia. The common name for Gymnorhina tibicen leuconota is the white-backed magpie. The name piping shrike is rarely found in current bird books, but it remains as an occasionally used local name for the bird because of the continuous history of the name as the bird on the state flag of South Australia.

The name for the bird which appears in Governor Tennyson's handwriting on the back original painting is “Australian piping shrike”.

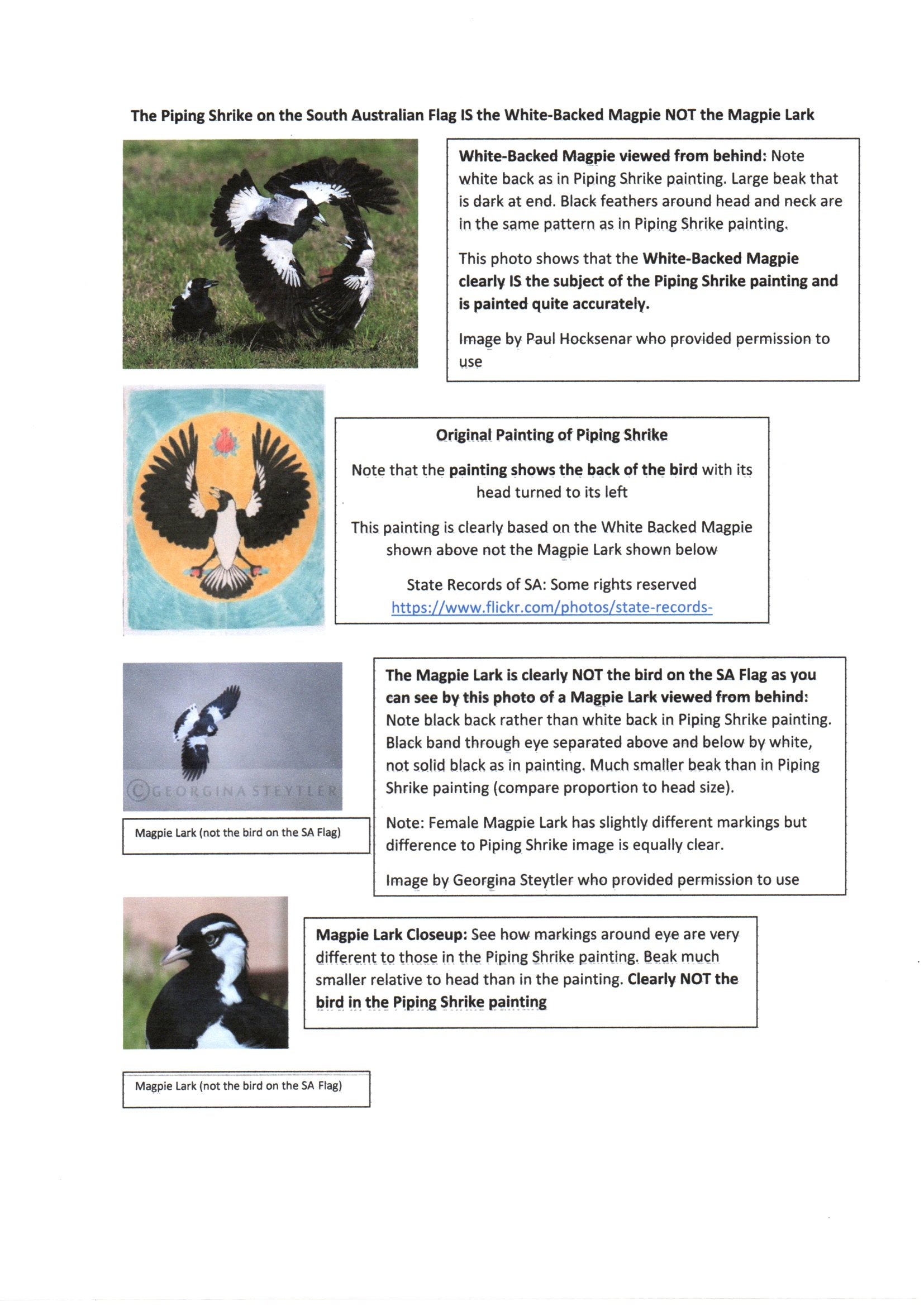

The connection of this bird to the name piping shrike can be seen in this early observation by explorer Charles Sturt in the 1840s:

"GYMNORHINA LEUCONOTA GOULD., The White-backed Crow Shrike. This bird is somewhat larger than, and very much resembles a magpie, but the proportion of white is greater, and there is no metallic or varied tint on the black feathers as on the European bird. In South Australia it is a winter bird, and his clear fine note was always the most heard on the coldest morning, as if that temperature best suited him. All the species of this genus are easily domesticated, and learn to pipe tunes. They are mischievous birds about a house, but are useful in a garden. I had one that ranged the fields to a great distance round the house, but always returned to sleep in it." Note: This observation is comparing the White Backed Crow Shrike (earlier name for the White Backed Magpie) to the Eurasian Magpie known to the early English colonists.

Over time, Australian magpies have been associated with the terms crow, shrike, and magpie. These names were given to them by early arrivals as there was a perceived similarity to the birds, having these names, in Europe. It is now known that the Australian magpie is neither a magpie, crow, nor shrike in the European sense of the words. The Australian magpie is most closely related to the Australian butcherbirds.

Usage of the common names piping crow-shrike and white backed crow-shrike eventually lost favour and were replaced by black-backed magpie and white-backed magpie. This may have been influenced by the work of Robert Hall, who was a fellow of the Linnean Society, which was founded in 1788 and is “dedicated to the study of natural history and taxonomy.” The society is the oldest of its type, and seems to have played quite a role in the early natural history of Australia.

In his book Useful Birds of Southern Australia, published in 1907, Robert Hall argued that the name magpie was a misnomer and that the names piping crow-shrike and white backed crow-shrike were the correct names. However, he stated that he would defer to popular opinion and he retained the names white-backed magpie and the black-backed magpie in the book. He also noted that the two birds appeared to be varieties of the same species.

In today's taxonomies, the very apt name tibicen, which is related to piping, is retained in the scientific name Gymnorhina tibicen for all races of the species.

In Higgins et al. Handbook of Australian, New Zealand and Antarctic birds, piping shrike is listed as one of the other English names for the Australian magpie.

In Australian Bird Names Origins and Meanings, Fraser and Gray include “Piping Shrike, as formally described on the South Australian flag and coat of arms” in the section on other names for Gymnorhina tibicen telonocua (the White-backed Magpie).

In Birds of South Australia, Shane Parker, curator of birds, South Australian Museum, states that the white-backed magpie is the “piping shrike” of South Australia's badge.

The Wakefield Companion to South Australian History states: "a white-backed magpie (piping shrike) on the branch of a gum tree against a yellow background, representing the rising sun."
