= Black swan emblems and popular culture =

Figurative language with the black swan

Flag of Western Australia

Coat of arms of Western Australia

The black swan (Cygnus atratus) is widely referenced in Australian culture, although the character of that importance historically diverges between the prosaic in the east and the symbolic in the west. The black swan is also of spiritual significance in the traditional histories of many Aboriginal Australian peoples across southern Australia. Metaphoric references to black swans have appeared in European culture since long before Europeans became aware of Cygnus atratus in Australia in the 18th century.

The black swan is the official state emblem of Western Australia and is depicted on the flag and coat of arms of Western Australia. The symbol is used in other emblems, coins, logos, mascots and in the naming of sports teams.

== Aboriginal history and lore ==
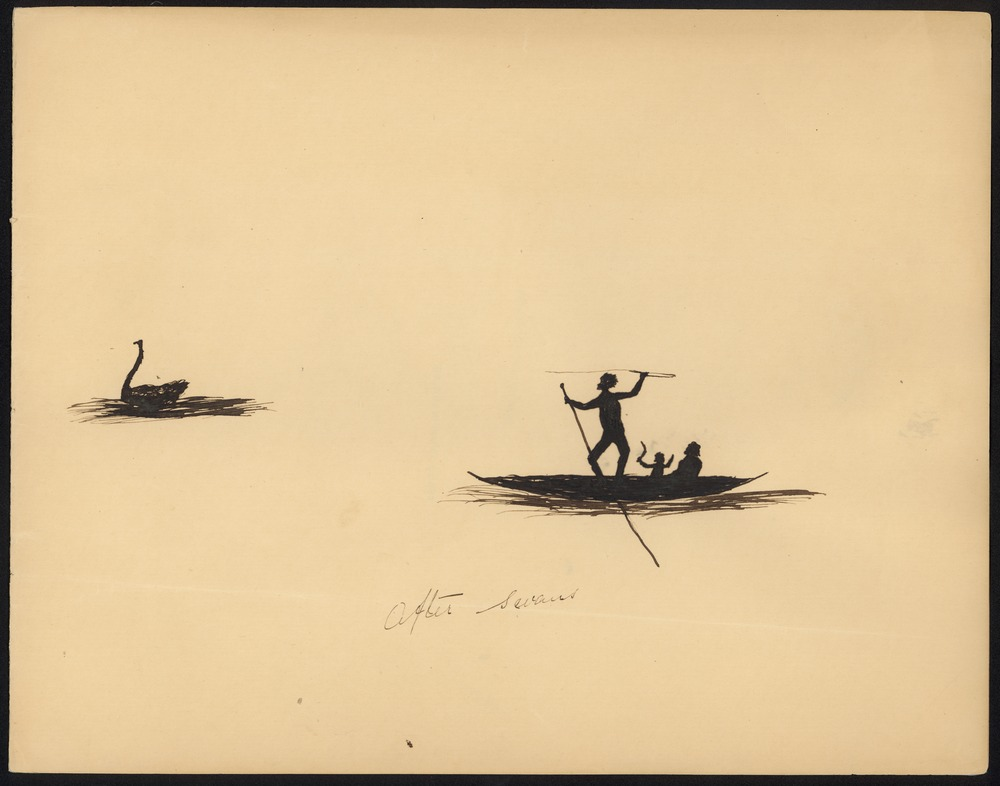
Aboriginal hunters and black swan, by Tommy McRae, v. 1865

Daisy Bates recorded a Nyoongar man called Woolberr "last of the black swan group" of the Nyungar people of south-western Australia in the 1920s. The website of the Premier of Western Australia refers to Nyungar lore of how the ancestors of the Nyungar people were once black swans who became men.

The Dreamtime story of the black swans tells how two brothers were turned into white swans so they could help an attack party during a raid for weapons. It is said that Wurrunna used a large gubbera, or crystal stone, to transform the men. After the raid, eaglehawks attacked the white swans and tore feathers from the birds. Crows who were enemies of the eaglehawks came to the aid of the brothers and gave the black swans their own black feathers. The black swan's red beak is said to be the blood of the attacked brothers, which stayed there forever.

The moral code embedded in Aboriginal lore is evident in a story from an unspecified locality in eastern Australia (probably in New South Wales) published in 1943. An Aboriginal man, fishing in a lagoon, caught a baby bunyip. Instead of returning the baby to the water, he wanted to take the bunyip back to the camp to boast of his fishing prowess, against the urging of his friends. Before he could do anything, the angry mother bunyip rose from the water, flooding swirling water around them, and took back her baby. As the water receded, the men found that they had been changed into black swans. As punishment for the fisherman's vanity, they never regained their human form, but could be heard at night talking in human voices as a reminder to their human relatives of the perils of pride and arrogance.

== European myth and metaphor ==
The Roman satirist Juvenal wrote in AD 82 of rara avis in terris nigroque simillima cygno ("a rare bird in the lands, and very like a black swan"). He meant something whose rarity would compare with that of a black swan, or in other words, as a black swan was not thought to exist, neither did the supposed characteristics of the "rare bird" with which it was being compared. The phrase passed into several European languages as a popular proverb, including English, in which the first four Latin words ("a rare bird in the land") are often used ironically. For some 1,500 years, the black swan existed in the European imagination as a metaphor for that which could not exist.

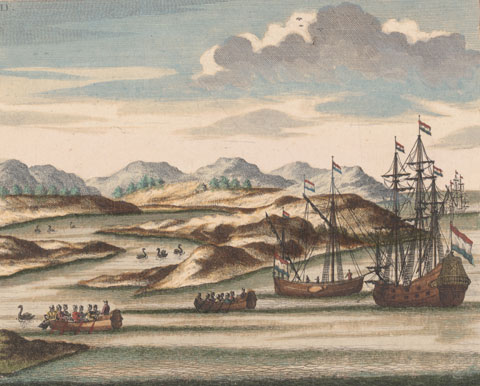
Willem de Vlamingh's ships, with black swans, at the entrance to the Swan River, Western Australia, coloured engraving (1726), derived from an earlier drawing (now lost) from the de Vlamingh expeditions of 1696–97

The Dutch explorer Willem de Vlamingh made the first European record of sighting a black swan in 1697, when he sailed into, and named, the Swan River on the western coast of New Holland. The sighting was significant in Europe, where "all swans are white" had long been used as a standard example of a well-known truth. In 1726, two birds were captured near Dirk Hartog Island, 850 kilometres (530 mi) north of the Swan River, and taken to Batavia (now Jakarta) as proof of their existence.

Governor Phillip, soon after establishing the convict settlement some sixty years later and 3,000 kilometres (1,900 mi) away at Botany Bay on the east coast, wrote in 1789 that "A black swan, which species, though proverbially rare in other parts of the world, is here by no means uncommon ... a very noble bird, larger than the common swan, and equally beautiful in form ... its wings were edged with white: the bill was tinged with red." A contemporary, Surgeon-General John White, observed in 1790, "We found nine birds, that, whilst swimming, most perfectly resembled the rara avis of the ancients, a black swan."

The taking of black swans to Europe in the 18th and early 19th centuries brought the birds into contact with another aspect of European mythology: the attribution of sinister relationships between the devil and black-coloured animals, such as a black cat. Black swans were considered to be a witch's familiar and often chased away or killed by superstitious folk. This may explain why black swans have never established a sizeable presence as feral animals in Europe or North America.

While the European encounter with the black swan along Australia's west coast in the late 17th and early 18th centuries led to the shattering of an age-old metaphor, their contact on the east coast in the late 18th and early 19th centuries merely confirmed the new post-proverbial view, before turning to account for the black swan as just one more curiosity in the South to be utilised in developing the colonies.

In Tchaikovsky's Swan Lake, the sinister and seductive black swan, Odile, is contrasted with the innocent white swan, Odette.

== Western Australia ==
=== Heraldry ===
The coat of arms of Western Australia includes a black swan as the principal charge on the shield. A black swan on a gold plate or disk has been the official badge of the state since 1876, and is shown on the flag of Western Australia. The coat of arms of Australia (1912 version) shows, in its fifth quarter, the black swan on a gold field, representing the state as one of the original states in the federation.

Image from a Western Australia Planning Commission document; the motto refers to black swans.

Although the State Arms were granted in 1969, municipal heraldry had already been using the black swan symbolism since 1926, when the coat of arms of Perth were granted with a black swan as a charge in the first quarter and black swan supporters. This was followed by Northam (1953, black swan crest) and Bunbury (1959, black swan crest). Following the grant of the State Arms, municipal arms continued this tradition: Fremantle (1971, charge), Gosnells (1978, charge), Melville (1981, supporters) and Subiaco (1984, crest). All of the municipal arms granted by the Crown have included a representation of a black swan.

In the history of the Western Australian Government Railways – the black swan emblem occurred between the 1920s to the 1980s.

Several state authorities have also been granted arms showing a black swan: St George's College at the University of Western Australia (1964, charges), Fremantle Port Authority (1965, crest), and the University of Western Australia (1972, charges). The university had used an assumed version of these arms since 1913, and the university's student guild reaffirmed its assumption and use of a differenced version of the University Arms in 1991. Authorities with assumed arms showing a black swan include Royal Perth Hospital (1936, charge), and the University of Western Australia residential colleges of St Thomas More (charge), Currie Hall (charge) and St Catherine's (charge).

Religious authorities have also used representations of the black swan in their heraldic emblems. Of the two largest denominations in the state, there are the Anglican dioceses of Kalgoorlie (1956, charge) and North West Australia (1956, charge); and the Roman Catholic Archdiocese of Perth (charge).

=== Philately ===
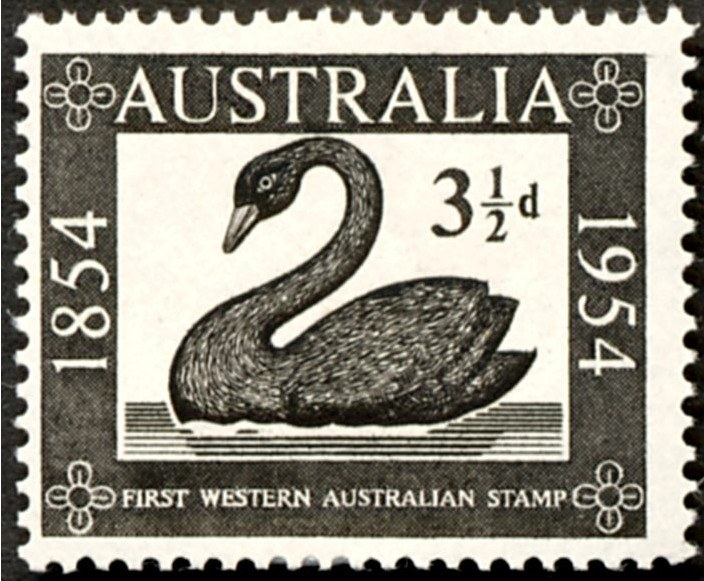
1954 Australian stamp commemorating the first Western Australian stamp which featured the black swan

The Colony of Western Australia produced its first postage stamps in 1854, and in contrast to the usual practice within the British Empire, they featured, not a portrait of Queen Victoria, but an image of the black swan. The design of the stamp underwent several modifications over the next 48 years, until 1902, when the last design was produced, although the swan stamps continued in use until 1913, when Australian stamps superseded the colonial/state issues. The most famous of the series was the four-penny Blue Inverted Swan produced in 1855, in which the central image was printed upside down. The stamp is now an acknowledged philatelic rarity, with only fifteen known to have survived. Stamp issues in all of the other British colonies in Australasia, such as New South Wales, featured royal portraits rather than local symbols, apart from some one-off commemorative issues.

=== Decorative arts ===
Black swans feature as emblems and decorations on many important public buildings in Western Australia. An example is the tower of the Fremantle Town Hall.

The Wembley Ware range of "fancy ware" was produced between 1945 and 1961 by HL Brisbane and Wunderlich Ltd/Bristile in Subiaco. The Wembley Ware range typified the spirit of post-war buoyancy in Western Australia during the 1950s, with art ceramics specifically for a local market using emblems of local Western Australian identity. The majority of the works were decorative rather than functional to escape high taxes on purely decorative ceramics at this time and exploited highly coloured glazes and overtly Australian content in their designs. The majority of Wembley Ware was created with an apparent intended purpose such as vases, ashtrays or lamps, but these were usually superfluous to the designs. Some of the most sought-after and eccentric designs included the open-mouthed dhufish vase and black swan ashtray. A variety of swan-shaped ashtrays and vases were produced in a range of sizes, colours and glazes.

=== Literature ===
Explorers' journals, as a literary genre, often provide descriptions of black swans. For example, in December 1836, Lieutenant Bunbury of the 21st Fusiliers was the first European to travel overland from Pinjarra to Busselton, describing the mudflats of the Leschenault Estuary at sunset covered by "immense flocks of Brown Ducks and Teal, while the water was equally covered with Swans and Pelicans."

The early colonist George Fletcher Moore included in his 1831 ballad "So Western Australia for Me" the lines:

No lions or tigers are we dread to meet,
Our innocent quadrupeds hop on two feet;
No tithes and no taxes, we here have to pay,
And our geese are all swans, as some witty folk say.

The final line recalls an old English saying: "All his swans are turned to geese", meaning all his expectations end in nothing; all his boasting ends in smoke, like a person who fancies he sees a swan on a river but finds it to be only a goose. The phrase is sometimes reversed (as Moore has done): "All his geese are swans", which was commonly applied to people who think too much of the beauty and talent of their children and derived from Aesop's fable "The Eagle and the Owl".

In Gaito Gazdanov's short story Black Swans (1930) the protagonist commits suicide because he has no opportunity of moving to Australia, which he imagines to be an idealised paradise of graceful black swans. D. H. Lawrence wrote in the 1925 short story "The Heritage":

Jack looked out at the road, but was much more enchanted by the full, soft river of heavenly blue water, on whose surface he looked eagerly for the black swans. He didn't see any.

"Oh yes! Oh, yes! You'll find em wild in their native state a little way up," said Mr Swallow.

— D. H. Lawrence

Mollie Skinner, Lawrence's co-author of The Boy in the Bush also wrote the novel Black Swans, published in 1925 by Jonathan Cape in London. She uses Juvenal's phrase rara avis in terris, nigroque simillima cygno (transl. a rare bird in the lands, and very like a black swan) as its subtitle. It alludes to her heroine, Letty Granville.

The potency of the image of the black swan as a signifier of Western Australian nationalism can be seen in this passage from Randolph Stow's "The Merry-Go-Round in the Sea", published in 1965:

Perth was ancient ... And it was a very special city, cut off from other cities by sea and desert, so that there was not another city for two thousand miles. Among all Australian cities it had proved itself the most special, by a romantic act called the Secession, which the other cities had stuffily ignored.

Cinderella State, he thought, feeling indignant. That was the reason for the Secession. Because they had ignored his poor Cinderella State, all one million square miles of it.

Maybe after this war there'd be another war. Western Australia against the world, Black Swan flying.

'We shouldn't have gone to Parliament House,' his mother had remarked, 'it seems to have made you political.' ...

'When will Western Australia be free?' he wondered.

'I don't know,' said his mother. 'Perhaps when Bonnie Prince Charlie comes over.'

'Aww.' He grew disgusted at her flippancy.

— Randolph Stow

=== Place names ===
==== Aboriginal languages ====
The black swan is likely to be well represented in the toponymy of the south-west. One example is Kurrabup in the Nyungar language, or 'black swan place', being the local Aboriginal name for the Wilson Inlet upon which the town of Denmark is situated in the South West.

==== English language ====
The English-language place name "Black Swan" only occurs as a descriptive toponym once: the Black Swan Mine in the arid interior of the state near Laverton.

The more generic toponym "Swan", invariably referring to black swans, has at least 34 examples in Western Australia, almost entirely in the state's south-west. These range from rural locations, such as Jebarjup Swan Lake in the Great Southern region, to the iconic Swan River. The Swan River is the source of at least eight shift names, forming the largest swan place-name cluster in Australia: Upper Swan, Middle Swan, Swan Valley, Swan View, West Swan, Swan Estuary, Swan District, and the City of Swan. The Swan Land District is the major cadastral unit of the state, underlying much of the name cluster. There are at least twenty "Swan" street names in the Perth metropolitan area.

There are no "White Swan" toponyms in the state, and the toponymist Reed lists only the Swan River as a "Swan" toponym in the state.

The rarer form of Cygnet ('young swan') only occurs in three places, all along the Kimberley coast, where they commemorate the passage of William Dampier and the mutineers on the Cygnet in 1688.

=== Shipwrecks ===
With one-third of Australia's continental coastline within Western Australia, the cultural associations reflected in the scattering of shipwrecks named "Black Swan" is surprisingly small. A lone cutter was wrecked in May 1851 in the Peel-Harvey Estuary near Mandurah. The large estuaries of the south-west of the state are strongly associated with black swans. There are six records for the more generic shipwreck name "Swan" between 1869 and 1972 on the north-west and west coasts, three times more than any other state, as well as the destroyer escort HMAS Swan, which was scuttled in Geographe Bay in 1997 as an artificial reef.

== Eastern Australia ==
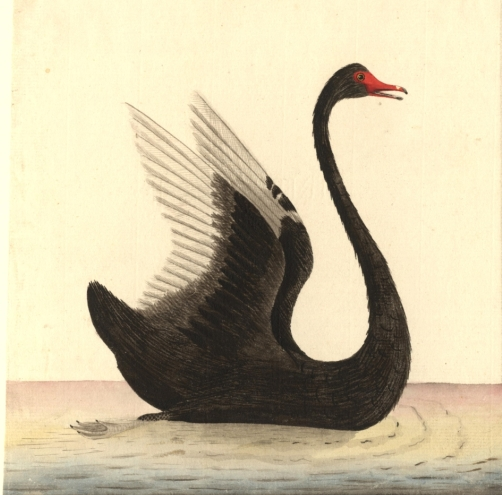
Drawing published in 1792. Entitled Black Swan, native name "Mulgo", it is attributed to the Port Jackson Painter.

=== Heraldry ===
The coat of arms of Canberra, granted in 1928, includes swans as supporters. One swan is the black Australian kind, and the other white (similar to a European mute swan), said to be symbolising the Aboriginal and European people of Australia. A different version of this appear in the flag of the Australian Capital Territory. No other state or territory arms in eastern Australia include a black swan.

Some 77 municipalities across eastern Australia have received grants of arms from the Crown since 1908, but only four include a black swan: Lake Macquarie (1970, supporter) and Queanbeyan (1980, supporter) in New South Wales, and Springvale (1976, supporter) and Sale (1985, supporters) in Victoria. These all indicate the presence of black swans in the municipal area. The City of Campbelltown in New South Wales has a white swan in the crest of its arms (1969), alluding to the arms of its namesake Campbell family.

There are three grants of arms to corporations that include a black swan. In 1931, the Bank of New South Wales (now Westpac) was granted arms with a black swan supporter alluding to the Bank's acquisition of the Western Australian Bank in 1927. In the same year, the Royal Australasian College of Surgeons was granted arms with a black swan in the first and fourth quarters, apparently derived from the Australian Arms. In 1965, the Australian Academy of Science was granted arms with a black swan as a crest, alluding to the Academy's "Australianness" and its location in Canberra.

Two religious authorities in eastern Victoria, the Anglican Diocese of Gippsland and the Roman Catholic Diocese of Sale, have a black swan as a charge on their diocesan arms.

=== Philately ===
The transfer of postage-stamp production from the states to the Commonwealth in 1913 has resulted in four issues being produced featuring a black swan design, three commemorating a Western Australian anniversary. In 1929, a stamp designed by Perth architect George Pitt Morrison, featuring a black swan taken from one of the colonial stamp designs, marked the state's centenary. In 1954, the centenary of the first Western Australian stamp was marked by a commemorative issue in a similar style to the original one-penny Black Swan. In 1979, the state's 150th anniversary was marked with an issue featuring the anniversary logo, a stylised black swan. A 1991 series of waterbirds included a 43-cent stamp showing a pair of black swans nesting with cygnets. This is the only philatelic recognition of the black swan's cultural values in eastern Australia as an emblem of estuarine and riverine environments characteristic of south-eastern Australia.

Incidental philatelic illustrations of the black swan include the 1962 British Empire and Commonwealth Games (held in Perth) stamp issue bearing the Arms of the City of Perth with black swan supporters and charge, a 1963 commemorative of Canberra's founding featuring the city's arms, with black swan supporter, and the 1990 series of rare colonial stamps that included a reproduction of the colonial 4d Blue Inverted Swan. The black swan appears in stamp issues illustrating the Australian Arms (as one of the charges on the shield) in 1948, 1951, 1975 and 1999; and in a 1981 Queen's Birthday commemorative illustrating Her Majesty's personal flag (which is banner of the shield in the Australian Arms).

=== Decorative arts ===
Images of the black swan played only a minor role in the development of Australian decorative arts between the 1890s and World War One. This was a period when Australian flora and fauna decorative motifs were widely used for the first time. Images of lyrebirds, sea horses, waratahs, flannel flowers, firewheels, cockatoos and palm leaves feature prominently in the work of Lucien Henry, but the only known example of his work with a black swan is in a design for a fountain. A fountain in the central courtyard of Sydney Hospital reminiscent of Henry's design includes several black swans. Australian motifs were popular in the Queen Anne Revival or Federation architectural style of the period, but the black swan is rarely seen among the kookaburras, eucalyptus leaves and rising suns.

In 1913, the sculptor William Priestly MacIntosh carved a "coat of arms" for each state on the pilaster capitals of the façade of the new Commonwealth Bank headquarters on Pitt Street, Sydney. He included a black swan on a shield for Western Australia, 56 years before the state was granted a coat of arms of a similar design. The Sydney Hospital fountain and the Commonwealth Bank façade are two uncommon examples of the use of the black swan in decorative arts in eastern Australia in the late 19th and early 20th centuries.

=== Literature ===
Black Swan occurs rarely in literary titles. The State Library of New South Wales catalogue lists only ten fiction titles, one of which is an English-language translation of Thomas Mann's 1954 work The Black Swan. Humphrey McQueen's book, The Black Swans of Trespass: The Emergence of Modernist Painting in Australia 1918–1944, takes its title from the final line of the poem "Durer: Innsbruck, 1495":

In its ignorance the vision of others. I am still
The black swan of trespass on alien waters.

This poem, the first by Ern Malley to be published in Angry Penguins (1943), became a celebrated literary event.

=== Place names ===
==== Aboriginal languages ====
The black swan is represented in the toponymy of eastern Australia. Several anglicised versions of local Aboriginal-language place names referring to black swans are known. Examples include Dunedoo (Wiradjuri language) on the Talbragar River, Berrima (Tharawal or Gundungurra language) in the Southern Highlands, and Mulgoa (Gundungurra language) on the Nepean River, all in New South Wales; and Maroochydore on Queensland's Sunshine Coast (Yuggera language: Muru-kutchi – meaning "red bill", the name of the black swan). Maroochydore is from Murukutchi-dha, the place of the black swan. This name was given by Andrew Petrie in 1842, who had two Brisbane River (Yuggera) Aboriginal men with him from whom he presumably heard the words. The local name for the swan is Kuluin. Barwon Heads, Victoria, is near Lake Connewarre, through which the Barwon River flows on its way to the sea. The name Connewarre is the local aboriginal name for the black swan, which was found in large numbers on the lake.

There are also instances of such names being newly applied today; for example, Hydro Tasmania has adopted Aboriginal names for some parts of its hydro-electric developments, such as Catagunya, meaning black swan.

==== English language ====
The English-language place name "Black Swan" occurs as a descriptive toponym in four states, usually as a "name cluster". Queensland has a Black Swan Creek near Gladstone, together with nearby Black Swan Island and a Black Swan Rock further south near Shoalwater Bay; another Black Swan Creek near Maryborough; and a Black Swan Lagoon inland on the Darling Downs near Warwick. New South Wales has a Black Swan Anabranch adjoining a Black Swan Lagoon on the north side of the Murray River in the Corowa Shire. In South Australia's arid north, there is a Black Swan Swamp just north of Roxby Downs and a Black Swan Waterhole further north of the old Overland Telegraph line. Tasmania has a Black Swan Island near the wild South West Cape. Given the broad sweep of the black swan's natural habitat, the presence of only nine distinctive place names or name clusters within that range indicates the rarity of "Black Swan" as a toponym. New Zealand also has a Black Swan Stream in the South Auckland district.

The more generic toponym "Swan" invariably refers to black swans. The Gazetteer of Australia lists 57 examples in New South Wales, 32 in Tasmania, 20 in Queensland, 19 in Victoria, 10 in South Australia, 5 in the Northern Territory, and none in the other territories. Some idiosyncratic examples are Swan Hole (NSW), Swan Spit (Vic) and Swan Nook (Tas). The Gazetter also lists two "White Swan" toponyms: a mine and reservoir near St Arnaud, on the Victorian goldfields. A clear concentration is evident in New South Wales and Tasmania. By contrast, the toponymist Reed lists only three examples: Swan Hill and Swan Pond in Victoria, and Swan Point in Tasmania (all named by explorers after sighting black swans in large numbers).

In Sydney, there are thirteen "Swan" street names and one "Black Swan" street name, in contrast to a lone "Swan" street name in Darwin.

The rarer form of Cygnet ("young swan") occasionally occurs. The Gazetteer of Australia records eleven in Tasmania (the densest concentration), five in South Australia and one in Victoria, but Reed's only example is Cygnet, Tasmania, anglicised from Port des Cygnes, so-named by the French explorer Bruni d'Entrecasteaux in 1793 because of the large number of swans he observed there.

=== Shipwrecks ===
Another cultural association is reflected in the scattering of shipwrecks named "Black Swan". Tasmania has a wrecked schooner (1830) off Prime Seal Island in the Bass Strait and a wrecked fishing boat (1950) off Swansea on the east coast. New South Wales has two wrecks off its northern coast: a cutter near Newcastle (1852) and a paddle steamer (1868) near the Manning River. The name "Black Swan" probably refers to the aquatic characteristics of black swans such as buoyancy and a graceful style, even though the shipwreck record suggests the hope in the name association was not always well founded. There are five records for the more generic "Swan" between 1836 and 1934: one in Tasmania, and two each in Victoria and New South Wales, including torpedo-boat destroyer HMAS Swan, scuttled in 1934.

== Sport ==
=== Australian rules football ===
West Australian State of Origin guernsey

In Australian rules football, the symbol of the black swan has been used prominently by the Western Australian interstate teams since the state debuted in 1904. The black swan symbol has featured in the State of Origin series between 1977–1998 on the various guernsey designs (with some variations contrasting the swan depicted in the colours of the state emblem in reverse – as yellow on a black background and others with a yellow outline). The 1978 variation of the WA jumper was used one-off by the West Coast Eagles in the Australian Football League Heritage Round in July 2007.

The names of two Australian rules football clubs illustrate a contemporary variation of the ways in which cultural references to the black swan have changed and been transformed over time.

The Swan Districts Football Club was established in 1932 at Bassendean, near the industrial and railway hub of the Swan District and a large community of expatriate Victorians. The name associated the club with the place, as did its emblem of a black swan. The club has since played in the West Australian Football League.

The South Melbourne Football Club was established in 1874 and was one of the founding clubs in the VFL/AFL. During the 1920s and 1930s, an influx of players from Western Australia led to the team becoming known as the "swans" within the VFL. In 1982, South Melbourne transferred to Sydney, dropping its old place name but retaining its nickname as the Sydney Swans. The swan, however, is no longer a black swan but a white swan, derived from existing red and white colours of South Melbourne and the lake-bound white swans of Albert Park near its original home ground. The white swan is often combined with, or replaced by, a white Sydney Opera House-style logo.

This is an apparently rare example of Western Australian swan symbolism being transferred eastward, then transformed to symbolise something else, retaining only an echo of its formerly symbolic values. None of the current AFL teams have taken a black swan emblem in allusion to any natural qualities of the bird, and its sole representation in the symbology of the league refers to the largely unresearched phenomenon of late 19th-mid 20th century migration between Western Australia and Victoria – now borne by a club that has emigrated to New South Wales. It is an ironic transformation in the symbolism of a bird that was for so long thought to be non-migratory.

=== Sailing ===
The tender to Australia II, the yacht that won the 1983 America's Cup at Newport, Rhode Island, was called Black Swan.

== Music ==
Gian Carlo Menotti, in his opera The Medium, named one of his most famous arias "The Black Swan", which is a "dark lullaby" sung by the character Monica.

BTS released the single "Black Swan" ahead of their 2020 album Map of the Soul: 7. Its lyrics refer to an artist's fear of losing passion in their art and was praised by critics.

Perth rock group The Triffids released an album called The Black Swan in 1989.

The American thrash metal band Megadeth released a song entitled "Black Swan" as a bonus track on their 2007 album United Abominations. This song was later re-recorded and re-released on their 2011 album Thirteen.

Singer-songwriter Tori Amos released a song entitled "Black Swan" as a bonus track on her 1994 UK CD single "Pretty Good Year".

Singer Thom Yorke of the band Radiohead released a song entitled "Black Swan" on the soundtrack of the 2006 film A Scanner Darkly and, three days later, on his debut solo album, The Eraser.

The American alternative-rock band Chiodos released a song entitled "Lexington", which references black swans in the lyric, "All the water in the ocean couldn't turn this swan's legs from black to white."

The American avant-garde band The Blood Brothers released a song entitled "Giant Swan", in which a giant swan is used as a metaphor for society and war, until it is renamed in the lyric, "It's gonna sting like a raw sunrise when the Black Swan's gone."

Finnish power metal band Sonata Arctica included a song entitled "Fly With the Black Swan" on their 2007 album Unia.

American band Story of the Year released an album entitled The Black Swan in 2008.

The American ambient band Amber Asylum released a song entitled "Black Swan" on their 2000 album The Supernatural Parlour Collection.

The German death metal/gothic rock band Lacrimas Profundere released a song entitled "Black Swans" on their 1999 album Memorandum.

== Modern philosophy ==
John Stuart Mill in the chapter "Of The Ground of Induction" in his A System of Logic (1843) cited the example of "all swans are white" as a case of incorrect induction based on genuine experiences with erroneous conclusions. "As there were black swans, though civilized people had existed for three thousand years on the earth without meeting with them...The uniform experience, therefore, of the inhabitants of the known world, agreeing in a common result, without one known instance of deviation from that result, is not always sufficient to establish a general conclusion."

Bertrand Russell cited the case of the 'black swan' in his chapter "On Induction" in his 1912 publication The Problems of Philosophy.

"For example, a man who had seen a great many white swans might argue, by our principle, that on the data it was probable that all swans were white, and this might be a perfectly sound argument. The argument is not disproved by the fact that some swans are black, because a thing may very well happen in spite of the fact that some data render it improbable. In the case of the swans, a man might know that colour is a very variable characteristic in many species of animals, and that, therefore, an induction as to colour is peculiarly liable to error. But this knowledge would be a fresh datum, by no means proving that the probability relatively to our previous data had been wrongly estimated. The fact, therefore, that things often fail to fulfill our expectations is no evidence that our expectations will not probably be fulfilled in a given case or a given class of cases. Thus our inductive principle is at any rate not capable of being disproved by an appeal to experience. The inductive principle, however, is equally incapable of being proved by an appeal to experience."

— Bertrand Russell. 1912. "On Induction" The Problems of Philosophy

Karl Popper used the black swan example in his argument on falsifiability in The Logic of Scientific Discovery invoking David Hume.

"The answer to this problem is: as implied by Hume, we certainly are not justified in reasoning from an instance to the truth of the corresponding law. But to this negative result a second result, equally negative, may be added: we are justified in reasoning from a counterinstance to the falsity of the corresponding universal law (that is, of any law of which it is a counterinstance). Or in other words, from a purely logical point of view, the acceptance of one counterinstance to 'All swans are white' implies the falsity of the law 'All swans are white' – that law, that is, whose counterinstance we accepted. Induction is logically invalid; but refutation or falsification is a logically valid way of arguing from a single counterinstance to – or, rather, against – the corresponding law.This shows that I continue to agree with Hume's negative logical result; but I extend it.This logical situation is completely independent of any question of whether we would, in practice, accept a single counterinstance – for example, a solitary black swan – in refutation of a so far highly successful law. I do not suggest that we would necessarily be so easily satisfied; we might well suspect that the black specimen before us was not a swan."

— Karl Popper "The Problem of Induction" The Logic of Scientific Discovery

The Black Swan: The Impact of the Highly Improbable is the title of an influential 2007 book by Lebanese thinker Nassim Nicholas Taleb. The book expounds Taleb's theory that rare, unexpected, highly anomalous events are both more common and more momentous than previously imagined. This theory has since become known as the black swan theory.

== Sources ==
- Bennett, Bruce; Grono, William, eds. (1979). Wide Domain: Western Australian Themes and Images. Sydney: Angus & Robertson. OCLC 6942191.
  - Durack, M. "The Governor's Ball". In Bennett & Grono (1979), p. 47.
  - Lawrence, D. H. "The Heritage". In Bennett & Grono (1979), p. 63.
- Bunbury, Henry William St Pierre; Morrell, William Parker, eds. (1930), Early days in Western Australia: Being the letters and journal of Lieut. H.W. Bunbury, 21st fusiliers (PDF), London: Oxford University Press, OCLC 221171847, Wikidata Q136431240
- Low, C. (1971). A Roll of Australian arms: corporate and personal, borne by lawful authority. Sydney: Rigby.
- Reed, A.W. (1973). Place Names of Australia. Frenchs Forest: Reed Books.
