= L-plan castle =

Castle or towerhouse in the shape of an L

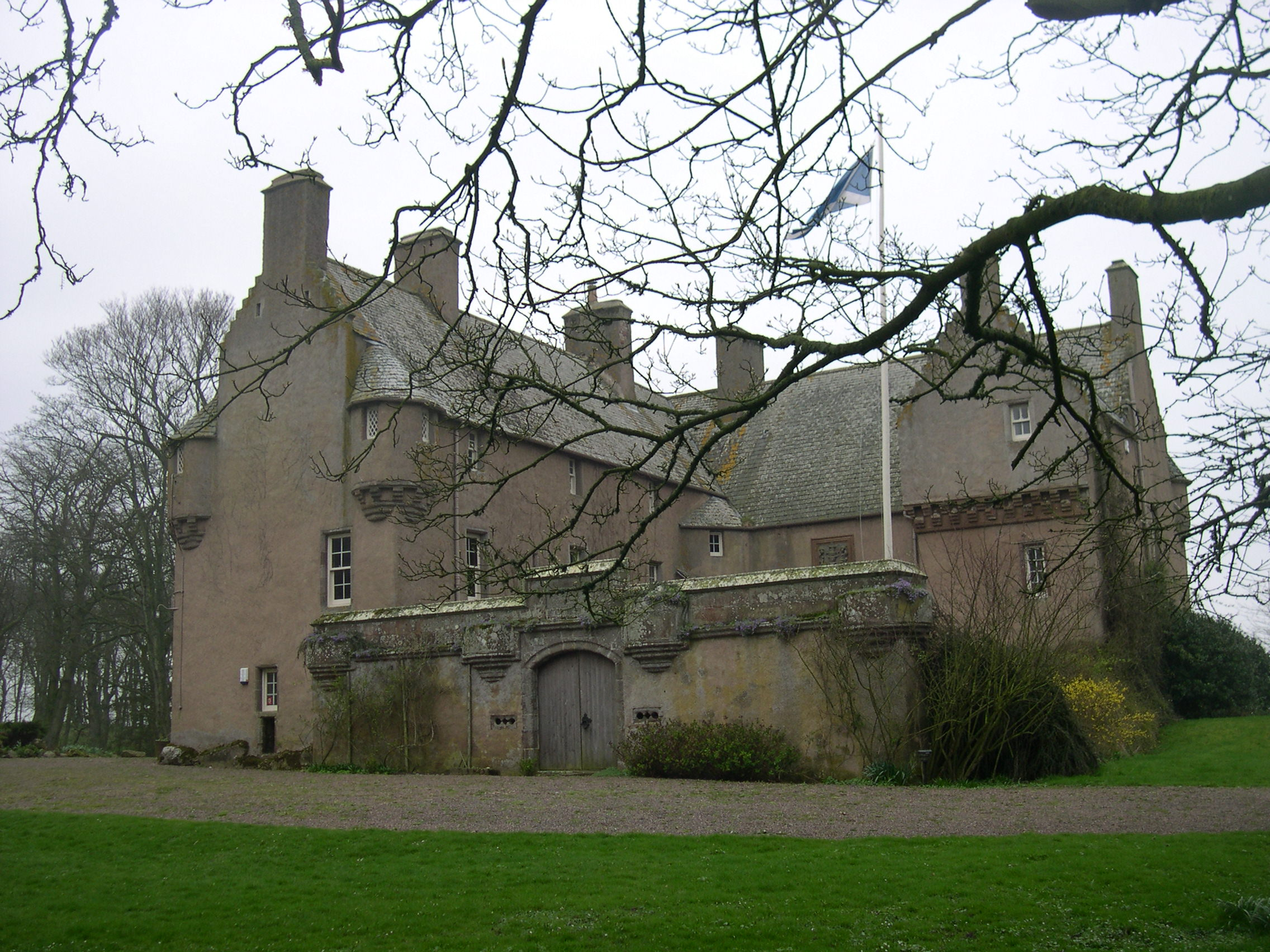
Muchalls Castle, Scotland

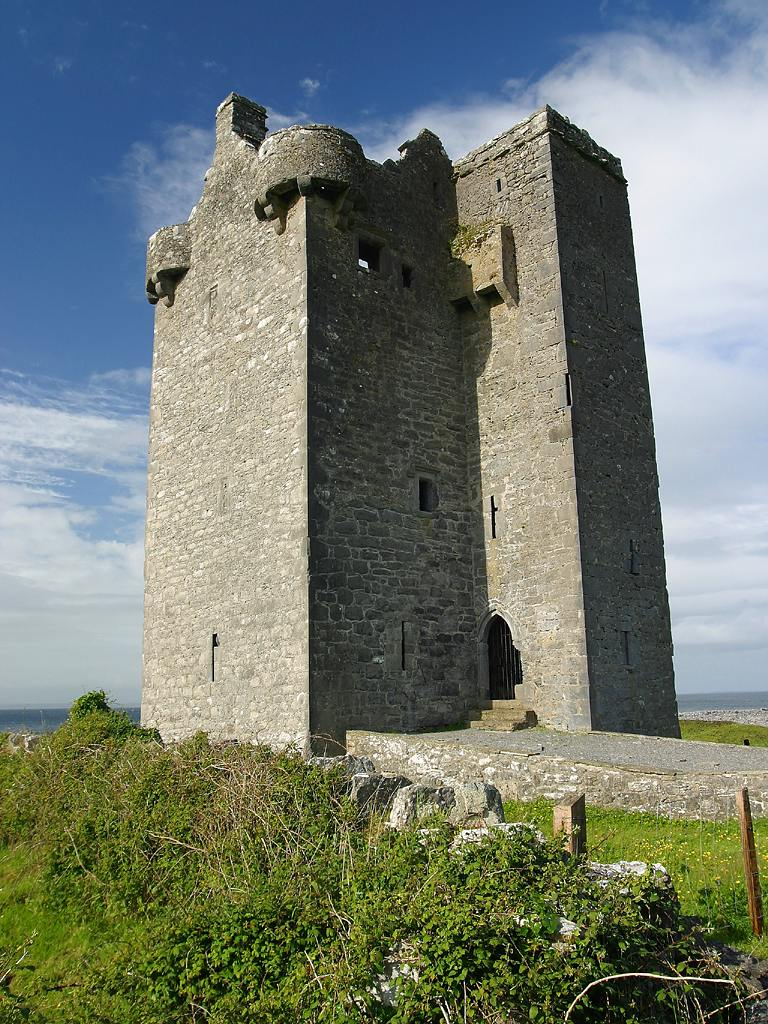
Gleninagh Castle, County Clare, Ireland

An L-plan castle is a castle or tower house in the shape of an L, typically built from the 13th to the 17th century. This design is found quite frequently in Scotland, but is also seen in England, Ireland, Romania, Sardinia, and other locations. The evolution of its design was an expansion of the blockhouse or simple square tower from the Early Middle Ages. As building techniques improved, it became possible to construct a larger building footprint and a more complex shape than the simple blockhouse tower. A more compelling motivation for the L plan was the ability to defend the entrance door by providing covering fire from the adjacent walls. This stratagem was particularly driven by the advent of cannon used by attackers.

It was common for the union of the two wings to have very thick wall construction to support a major defensive tower in the union area. For example, the stone walls of Muchalls Castle in Scotland are over 14 feet thick at the ground level. Built in the 13th century, these walls are thought to have supported a substantial defensive tower. A 17th-century reconstruction consisted of a probably equally tall structure, but one suited toward 17th century living and whose upper storey footprints mimicked the lower course.

Other examples of Scottish L-plan castles are Culzean Castle built in the late 16th century in Ayrshire; Dalhousie Castle built as a 15th-century towerhouse near Dalkeith in the Lothian region; Dunnottar Castle a partially ruined castle perched on a cliff by the North Sea near Stonehaven; Erchless Castle, a 14th-century castle in Inverness-shire; Fernie Castle constructed in the 16th century in Fife; and Neidpath Castle built by Clan Fraser in the 13th century near Peebles.

In Cagliari, Sardinia are two surviving structures known as the Torre dell'Elefante and Torre di San Pancrazio. Each of these towers, as well as a third structure destroyed by English and Spanish naval power, is an L-plan design. The structures date from the year 1300 and are each 30 metres in height. The towers served as important lookouts over the sea and toward the island interior.

== See also ==
- Z-plan castle
