= Flag of WA =

Flag of WA may mean:

- Flag of Washington
- Flag of Western Australia
- Flag of Wa State
