= Portcullis =

Heavy vertically-closing gate typically found in medieval fortifications

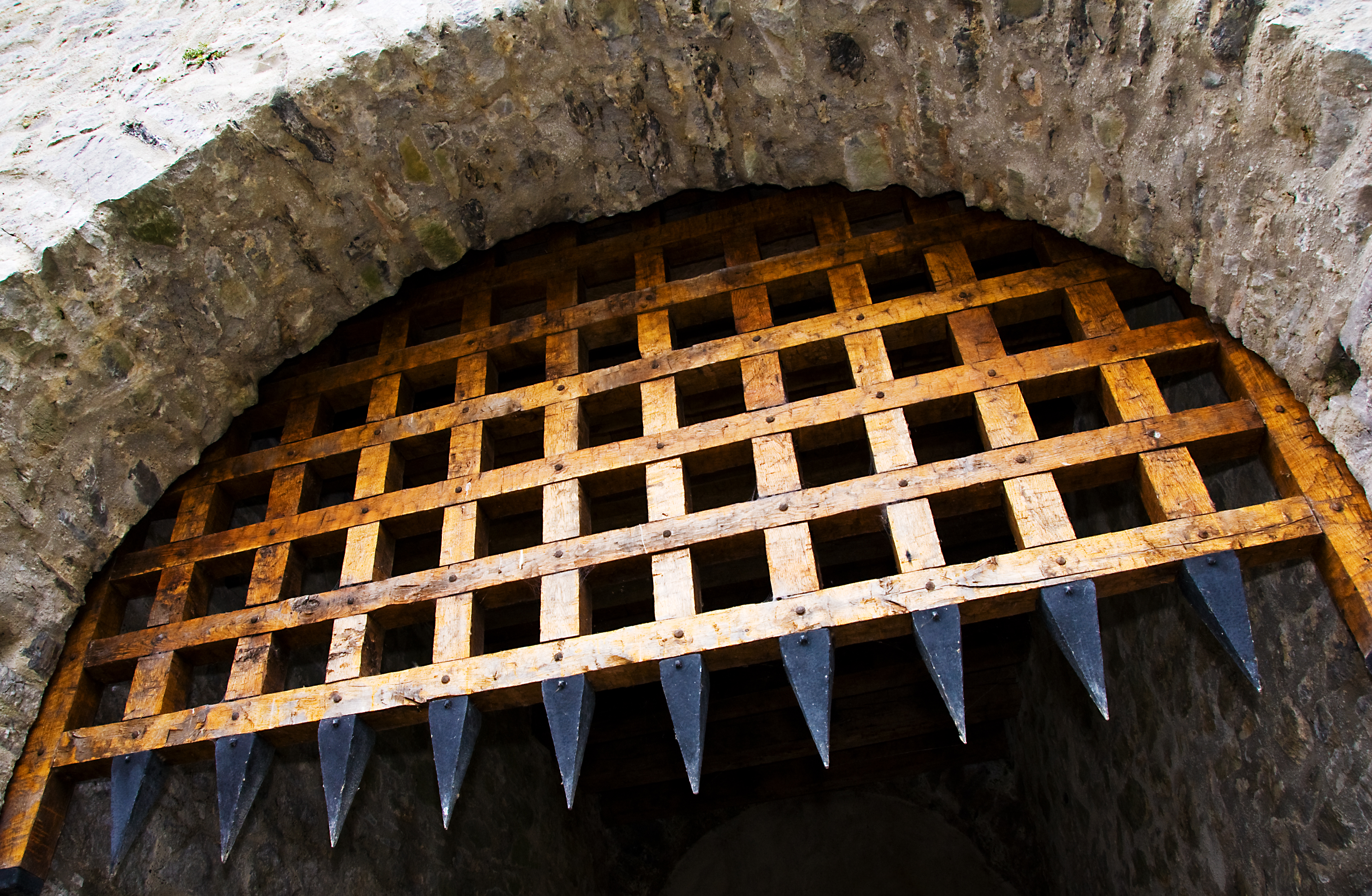
Portcullis at Desmond Castle, Adare, County Limerick, Ireland

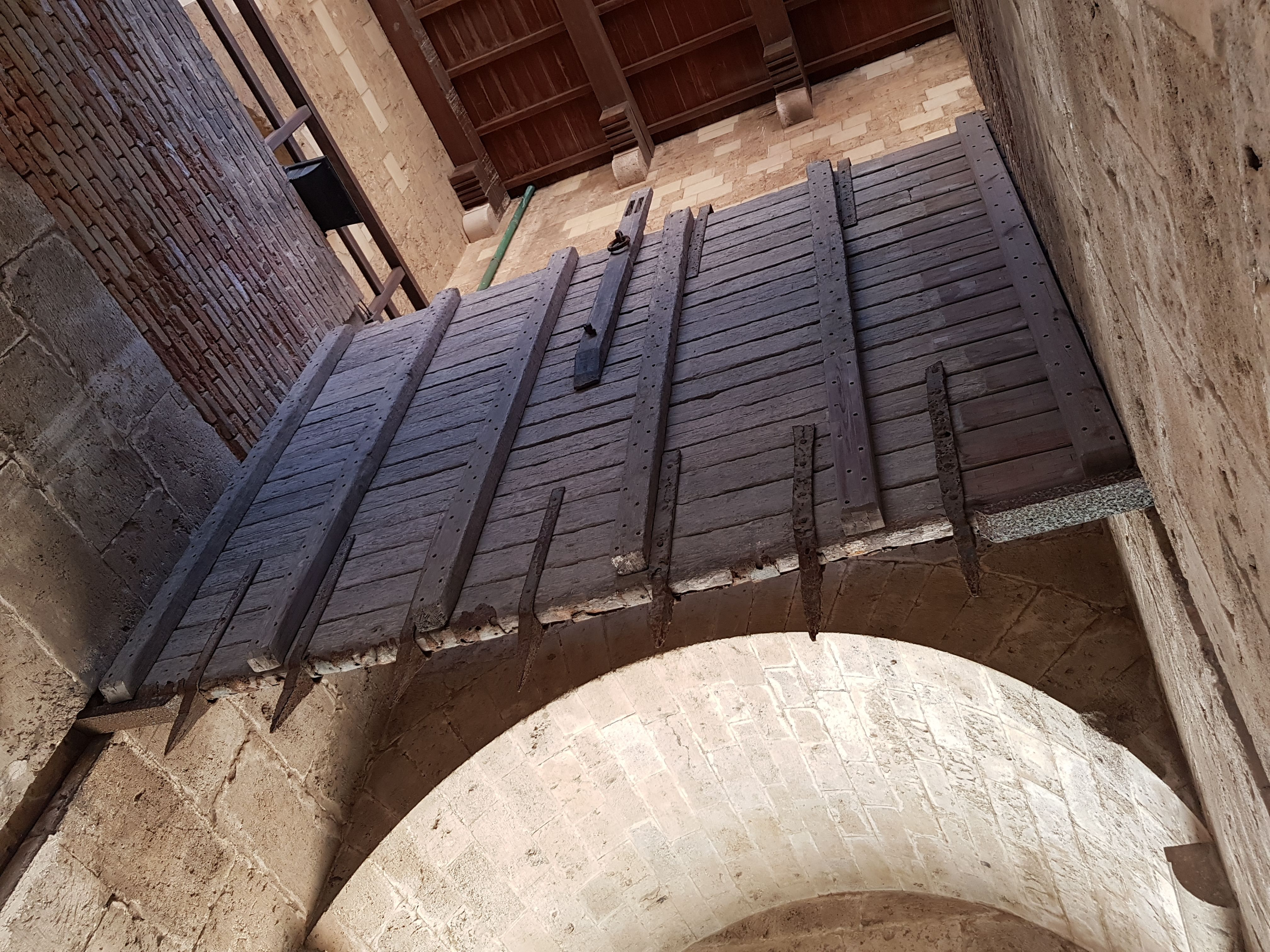
The inner portcullis of the Torre dell'Elefante in Cagliari, Sardinia, Italy

A portcullis (from Old French porte coleice "sliding gate") is a heavy, vertically closing gate typically found in medieval fortifications. It consists of a latticed grille made of wood and/or metal, which slides down grooves inset within each jamb of the gateway.

== Usage ==
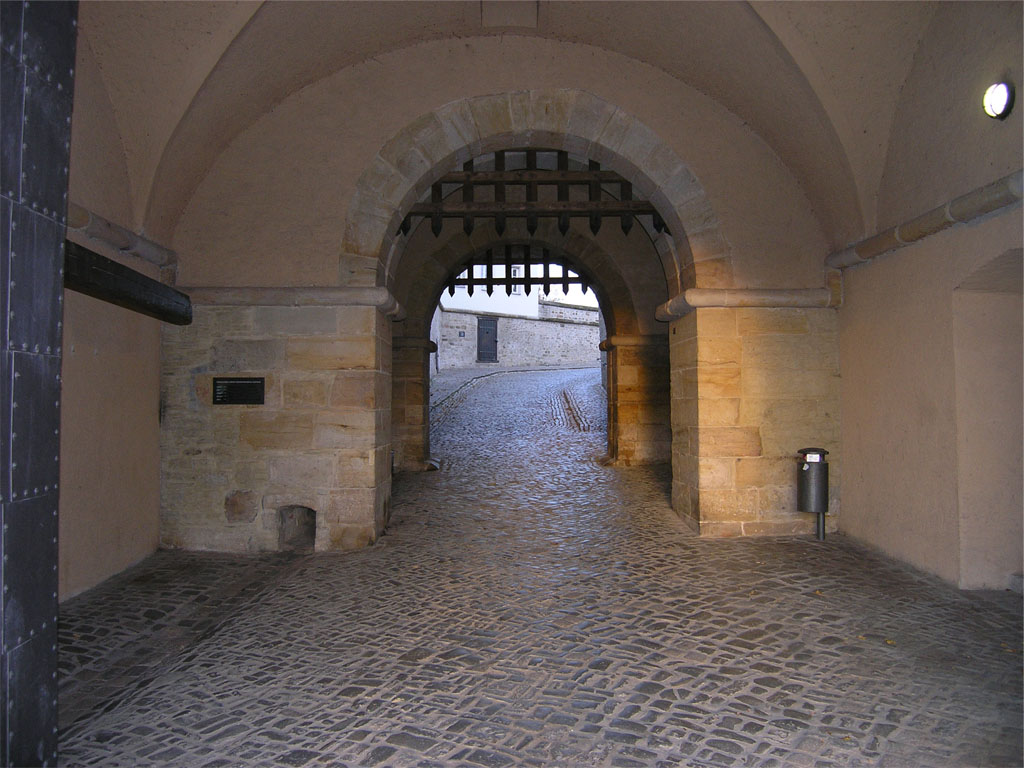
Double portcullis gates at Petersberg Citadel, Erfurt

Portcullises fortified the entrances to many medieval castles, securely closing them off during times of attack or siege. Every portcullis was mounted in vertical grooves in the walls of the castle and could be raised or lowered quickly by using chains or ropes attached to an internal winch. Portcullises had an advantage over standard gates in that they could be closed immediately at a time of crisis by a single guard.

Two portcullises to the main entrance were often used. The one closer to the inside would be closed first and then the one further away. This was used to trap enemies, and burning wood or fire-heated sand would usually be dropped onto them from murder holes or the roof. Hot oil, however, was not commonly used in this manner, contrary to popular belief, since oil was extremely expensive. Arrowslits in the sides of the walls enabled archers and crossbowmen to kill the trapped group of attackers.

In England, working portcullises survive at the Tower of London, Monk Bar in York, Hever Castle in Kent, and the hotel conversion, Amberley Castle. In Scotland, a working portcullis is at Edinburgh Castle.

== Heraldry ==
Beaufort Portcullis badge of the Tudors

The portcullis was the heraldic badge of the House of Beaufort, and the first Tudor king, Henry VII, who was of matrilineal Beaufort descent, adapted both the portcullis and the Tudor rose into Royal badges of the House of Tudor. Since then, the portcullis has been a moderately common motif of English heraldry, especially that heraldry dating from the Tudor period. The heraldic office of Portcullis Pursuivant of Arms in Ordinary, a junior officer of arms in the College of Arms at London, dates from this period.

Through Lord Charles Somerset, son of The 5th Duke of Beaufort, the portcullis has found its way into several South African coats of arms. Somerset established several towns during his governorship at the then-Cape Colony and named them for his family. These include Worcester, Somerset West, Fort Beaufort, and Beaufort West. Institutions that derive the portcullis from these arms include a school, a chamber of commerce, and a rugby club. Other (around 30) South African coats of arms that include a portcullis are not necessarily related to either Lord Charles Somerset or any of the towns named after and by him.

The ensign of HM Customs and Excise

Although the Palace of Westminster served as the official royal residence for both Henry VII and Henry VIII until 1530, the current use of the portcullis as a symbol of the palace and of Parliament does not date from that time. Rather, the symbol was developed as part of Sir Charles Barry's plans for the rebuilt palace after the original burned down on 16 October 1834; he conceptualized the new palace as a "legislative castle", and the symbol of a castle gate—i.e., a portcullis—fit well with the scheme.

Since then, the portcullis has become the primary symbol of Parliament; an office building for Members of Parliament (MPs), opened in 2001, is named "Portcullis House". During the 20th century, use of the portcullis as a symbol of Parliament spread beyond Britain and to the other Commonwealth realms. For instance, the coat of arms of Canberra has a portcullis in its crest, preserving a connection between the British Parliament at Westminster and the Australian Parliament to which Canberra is home.

The badge, coat of arms, and flag of the Canada Border Services Agency all include a portcullis, symbolizing the agency's role as His Majesty's agents responsible for the border services of Canada. A portcullis was previously found on the British one-penny coin and on the predecimal thrupenny bit; this has since been replaced by a section of the Royal Arms of the United Kingdom. It was also featured in the now-defunct HM Customs and Excise in the United Kingdom and still appears in the rank insignia for the various grades of commissioner in the Australian Border Force.

The portcullis may appear:

- as a charge in its own right, as in the arms of the London Borough of Richmond: Ermine, a portcullis chained or, a bordure gules charged with eight fleurs-de-lys or
  - with nail heads shown in a contrasting colour, as in the arms of Wallingford Town Council: Gules, a portcullis or studded sable, chained Argent, ensigned with an ancient crown of the second, all within an orle of bezants
  - with spikes of a contrasting colour, as in the crest of Tendring District Council: ...a portcullis or, nailed and spiked azure
- in the gateways of castles, fully lowered or part raised, as in the arms of Winchester City Council: ...five castles triple towered in saltire argent masoned proper the portcullis of each part-raised or...; though these do not appear in gateways of castles unless the blazon specifies them.

It is often shown with chains attached, even when the blazon does not mention them.

== See also ==
- Drawbridge
- Hoarding (castles)
- Machicolation
- Sally port
- Yett

== Bibliography ==
- Kaufmann, J.E.; Kaufmann, H.W. (2001). The Medieval Fortress: Castles, Forts and Walled Cities of the Middle Ages. Greenhill Books. ISBN 1-85367-455-9.
