= Coat of arms of Canberra =

Coat of arms of the City of Canberra
- Adopted: 8 October 1928
- Crest: A portcullis, covering a gum tree, topped by a crown.
- Shield: A blue shield containing a triple towered castle beneath a sword of justice (with a silver blade and a gold pommel and hilt) crossed with a gold parliamentary mace under a crown. Below the castle, a rose of york (white rose).
- Supporters: On the left, a black swan with a red beak. On the right, a mute swan.
- Motto: For the King, the Law and the People
- Use: ACT Government, ACT Legislative Assembly, ACT Magistrates Court

The coat of arms of Canberra (also known as the coat of arms of the Australian Capital Territory) was granted to the City of Canberra by King George V in 1928, to be used by "the Federal Capital Commissioners and their successors". In 1989, a year after the Australian Capital Territory (ACT) gained self-government, the arms began to be used by newly formed ACT Government. A modified version of this coat of arms also appears on the flag of the Australian Capital Territory, adopted in 1993.

== Symbolism ==
The various symbols of the coat of arms are explained below:

- The crown symbolises the authority of the King in the Commonwealth Government;
- The mace symbolises the law making authority of the Parliament of Australia;
- The sword depicts the sword of justice, representing national authority and the executive authority of the Commonwealth, exercised in the name of the Crown;
- The castle symbolises the dignity, importance and grandeur of the city and is similar to the castle depicted on the arms of the city of Exeter;
- The white rose is a White Rose of York, to recognise the role of the Duke of York (later King George VI) in the opening of Old Parliament House, thus establishing Canberra as the nation's new seat of government;
- The portcullis is taken from the arms of the city of Westminster, thereby linking Canberra with the then "virtual capital of the [British] empire";
- Behind the portcullis is a gum tree which "represents the growth and progress of Canberra, and the fact that it is garden city";
- The supporters are the Australian black swan and the European white mute swan, representing the Indigenous and settler populations;
- The motto is "For the King, the Law and the People", a translation of the Latin phrase "Pro Rege Lege et Grege". The motto was updated to "Queen" during the reign of Queen Elizabeth II, before reverting upon her death and the accession of King Charles III.

== History ==
The creation of the coat of arms of the city of Canberra originated in a request in July 1927 by the Commonwealth Department of Defence for a coat of arms to be used on the newly commissioned ship HMAS Canberra. The Department of Home Affairs and Territories subsequently announced in 1927, on behalf of the Federal Capital Commissioners (FCC), the creation of a competition for the design of the arms. 35 entries were received, with a modified version of a design by Sydney resident Charles Roxburgh Wylie selected and sent to the College of Arms in London for approval. According to the designer, one of the black swans was replaced with a white one after the College of Arms advised that they had just approved two black swans to be the supporters for the Perth coat of arms. The swans would now symbolise the white and Indigenous inhabitants of Canberra, much like the Aboriginal and seaman supporters on the 1928 Sydney coat of arms. The FCC also stated that the white swan was suggestive of the white Australia policy. Subsequently, on 8 October 1928 the arms, without supporters or a motto was granted by royal warrant by King George V. The College of Arms issued the official exemplification (artistic rendition) and blazon (description) on 7 November 1928. Later, the supporters and motto was granted on 9 November 1928 via letters patent.

In 2024, the ACT government confirmed that the coat of arms was displayed incorrectly on many buildings, with the position of the black and white swan reversed. Where the arms were displayed only in white on a dark background, the black swan was incorrectly displayed in white while the black swan had only an outline.

== Legal status ==
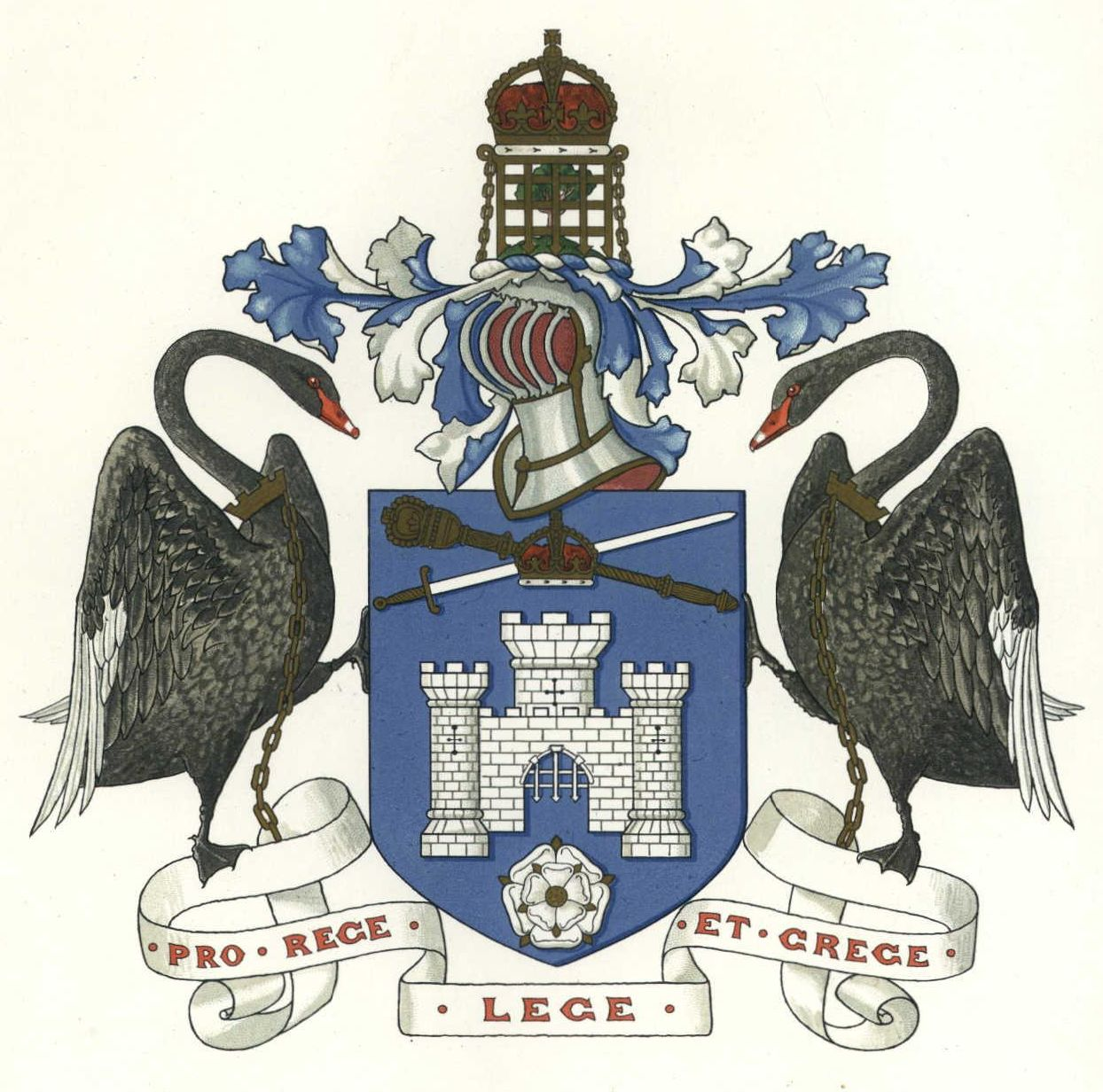
Original design for the coat of arms of Canberra, before modification

With the disbanding of the FCC in 1930, it is unclear what body has legal authority over the arms. In 1932 the Australian High Commissioner to London sought advice from the College of Arms, which advised that the Commonwealth Government is the legal successor. With the grant of self-government to the ACT in 1989, it is arguable that the ACT Government is now the rightful successor to the FCC. In 2019, the ACT Government acknowledge the ambiguity, however did not conclude either way.

Additionally, it is disputed whether the arms legally represent only the city of Canberra or the wider ACT. An inquiry in 2019 heard several views on this topic. Submissions suggesting the arms are limited to the city of Canberra noted that the grant was specifically for the "City of Canberra", unlike the grants made to the other states and territories. Such a distinction is important, as whilst Canberra makes up a large part of the ACT, it does not take up the entirety. Conversely, submissions suggesting the arms legitimately represent the territory as whole noted that any distinction between Canberra and the ACT is artificial or pedantic, as Canberra is not a separate legal entity, with no official borders with the rest of the ACT. The ACT government again acknowledged the ambiguity, but concluded that "the City of Canberra Coat of Arms should remain as an official symbol of the City of Canberra but there is no legal impediment to the [Australian Capital] Territory creating its own Coat of Arms."

== Blazon ==
The blazon (formal heraldic description) of the arms is as follows:

[Arms:] Azure a triple towered Castle, between in chief a Sword of Justice point upwards to the sinister Argent Pomel [sic] and Hilt Or surmounted by a Parliamentary Mace head upwards to the dexter Gold in saltire charged at their point of intersection with a representation of the Imperial Crown proper and in base a Rose also Argent, barbed and seeded proper (being the Badge of York).

[Crest:] On a Wreath of the Colours In front of a Gum Tree issuant from a Mount proper a Portcullis chained Or ensigned with the Imperial Crown also proper

[Supporters:] On the dexter side a Swan Sable beaked Gules and on the sinister side a White Swan proper

Exemplifications
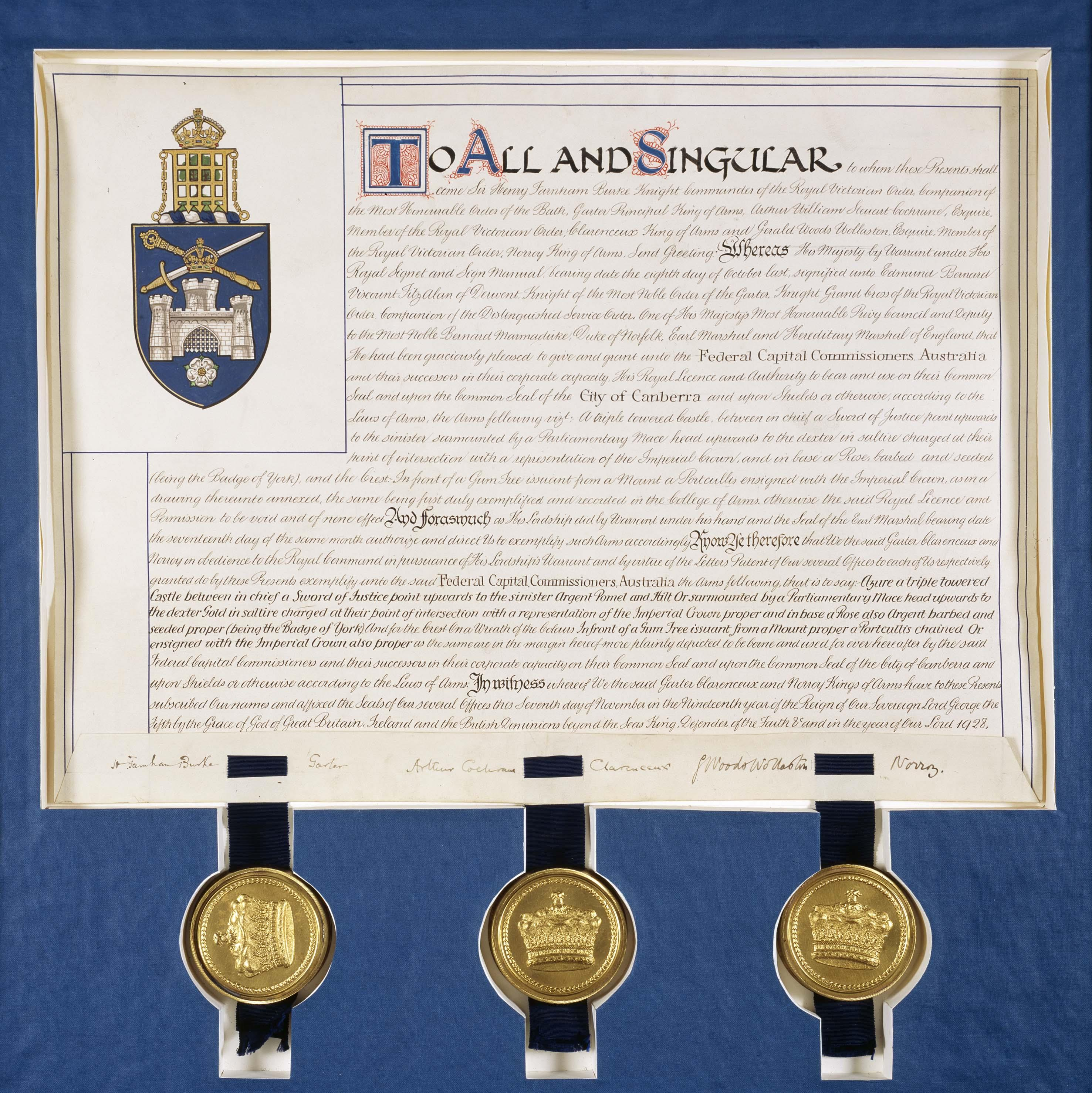
Exemplification of the initial grant of arms

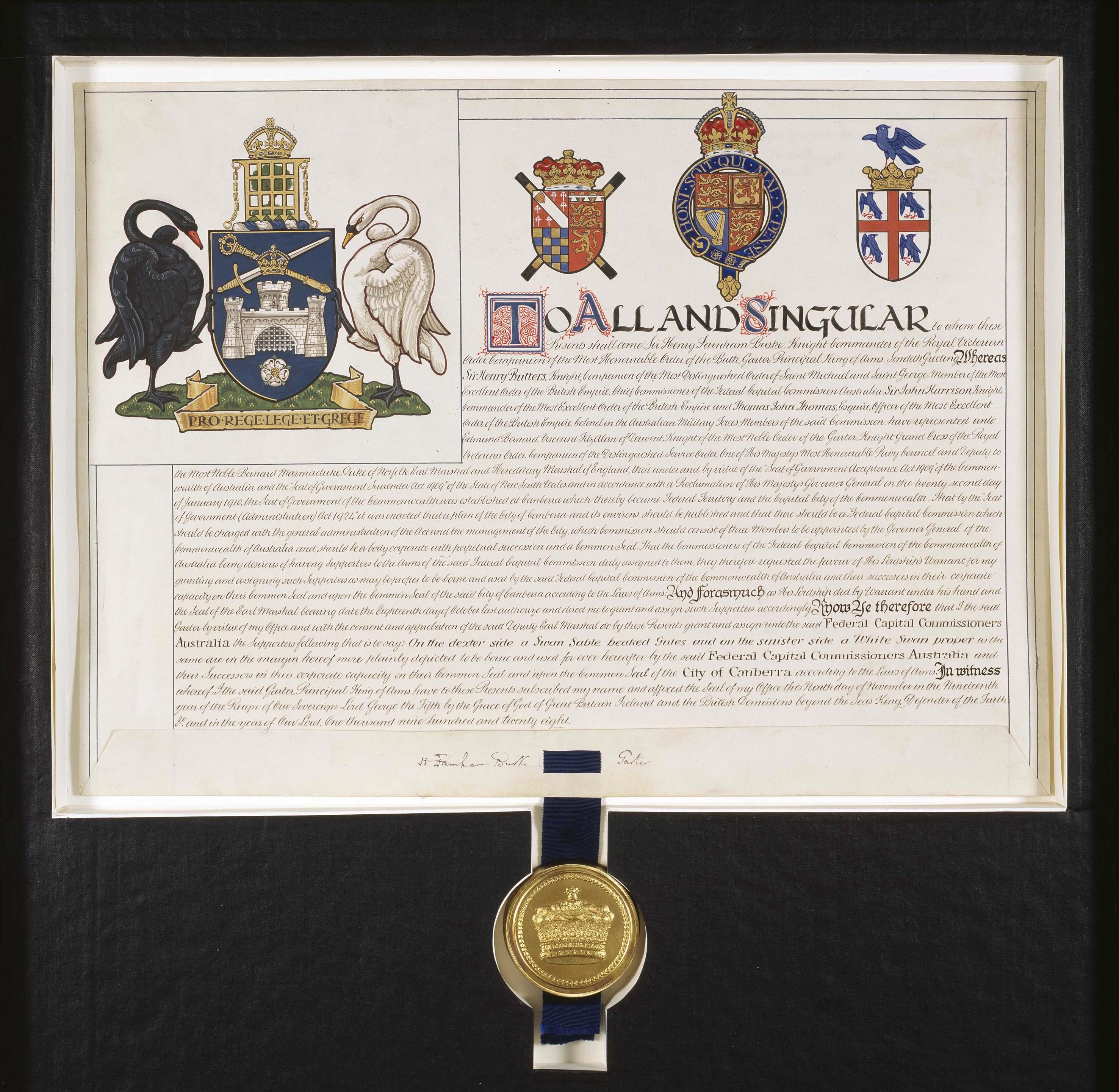
Exemplification of the grant of supporters for the arms

== Proposed Australian Capital Territory coat of arms ==
As of May 2024, there is no separate and distinct coat of arms for the Australian Capital Territory as a whole. Instead, the Canberra coat of arms have been used to represent the territory and the ACT government since 1989, when the newly formed government began using the city arms. For example, it is used as the logo of the government, it is included on the ACT flag, it appears on all acts passed by the Legislative Assembly and is depicted on the outside and inside the chamber of the Legislative Assembly building. However, following the adoption of the southern brush-tailed rock-wallaby as the mammal emblem for the territory in 2018, an inquiry was held into the creation of new coat of arms. In 2019, the inquiry recommending either changing the Canberra coat of arms or adopting a new territory coat of arms (depending on the legal status of the Canberra coat of arms) and changing the ACT flag. Following this, in 2019 the ACT government decided to adopt a new territory coat of arms or insignia, and began to consult online with ACT residents and the University of Canberra to create the new design. In 2021, the university exhibited coats of arms designed by students. Many of these designs included depictions of bogong moths, gang-gang cockatoos, southern brush-tailed rock wallabies, a royal bluebell, the Federation Star, representations of Parliament House and an Indigenous symbol for a meeting place. According to the government consultation website as of May 2024, the government is currently in the process of designing an ACT coat or arms or insignia, with a public vote to be held in 2024 to select the new design, for it to be formally adopted later that year.

== See also ==
- Australian heraldry
