= Coat of arms of Perth =

Coat of arms of the City of Perth
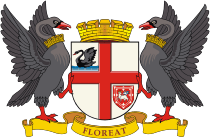
- Armiger: Lord Mayor of Perth
- Adopted: 1926
- Supporters: Black Swans
- Motto: Latin: floreat

The coat of arms of Perth, Western Australia were originally granted to the City of Perth on 2 December 1926. They were altered with the slight addition of part of the arms of Perth, Scotland in 1949.

The coat of arms at the Council House in St Georges Terrace were removed in 1999 during renovations and not replaced.

== Description and symbolism ==
The shield of the arms contains the red cross of St. George as shown on the flag of England. The top-left quarter of the shield and the supporters are black swans which are common to the area and significant to the original name of the Swan River Colony. Black swans are also shown on the Western Australian arms and flag. The fourth quarter of the shield is taken from the arms of Perth, Scotland, the city after which Perth is named. The helm is a gold brickwork crown, indicating these arms are for a municipality, and the supporting swans wear similar crowns around their necks. The motto, Floreat, is Latin for "flourish" or "prosper".

== Blazon ==
The official description, or blazon, of the arms is:

Argent a Cross Gules, in the first quarter a Swan Sable upon water proper, and in the fourth quarter on an Escutcheon Gules within a double Tressure counter flory a Holy Lamb passant reguardant, staff and cross Argent with the banner of St Andrew proper, the whole ensigned with a Mural Crown Or; and for the supporters: on either side a Swan wings elevated Sable, beaked and legged Gules, and gorged round the neck with a Mural Crown Or; and for the motto: FLOREAT.

== See also ==
- Coat of arms of Western Australia
- Flag of Perth
- Australian heraldry
