= Coat of arms of Western Australia =

Versions
- State badge of Western Australia
- Adopted: 17 March 1969
- Crest: The royal crown between two kangaroo paw (Anigosanthos Manglesii) flowers slipped proper.
- Torse: Or and sable
- Shield: Argent on a base wavy azure charged with a barrulet wavy argent a black swan naiant proper.
- Supporters: Red kangaroos bearing boomerangs proper
- Motto: None
- Order: None

The coat of arms of Western Australia is the official coat of arms of the Australian state of Western Australia. It was granted by a royal warrant of Elizabeth II, Queen of Australia dated 17 March 1969.

== Description ==
The shield has a silver (argent) field, with a rippled blue (azure) and silver (argent) base. A black swan in its natural colours swims on the upper blue ripple.

The crest is the royal crown in its proper colours on a wreath or torse of black (sable) and gold (or) between two kangaroo paw flowers in their natural colours of red and green.

The supporters are a red kangaroo on the dexter and sinister (the viewer's right and left) holding up the shield. They are each depicted proper (in natural colours). Each kangaroo holds in their forepaw a boomerang without any marks or symbols on it, and they stand upon a grassy compartment.

There is no motto with the coat of arms.

The official blazon, or heraldic description is contained in the royal warrant, and reads:

For Arms: Argent on a base wavy Azure charged with a barrulet wavy Argent a Black Swan naiant proper. And for Crest: On a Wreath Or and Sable The Royal Crown between two Kangaroo Paw (Anigosanthos Manglesii) flowers slipped proper. And for Supporters: On either side a Kangaroo holding in the exterior fore-paw a Boomerang proper.

The illustration in the royal warrant apparently shows the arms with helmet and mantling, but the Western Australian government has been advised that:

With the consent of the Garter Principal King of Arms, the Arms will be produced, for the use in Western Australia, in abbreviated form without the helmet and mantling. A helmet and mantling is depicted in correct heraldic form in the Warrant to conform to heraldic principles, but omission thereof for general usage is in line with the usage of the Commonwealth of Australia and of other Australian States.

== Symbolism ==
The black swan was noted by all of the early European maritime explorers who sailed along the Western Australian coast. In 1697 the Dutch explorer Willem de Vlamingh sailed into and named the Swaanerivier after the birds. In 1826 the British explorer Captain James Stirling recorded seeing some 500 black swans flying over the Swan River. The British colony in Western Australia was popularly known as the Swan River Colony from its foundation in 1829 until the beginning of the convict era in 1850.

The black swan is the official bird emblem of Western Australia, although only formally adopted in 1973. It also appears on the state badge as a black swan silhouetted against a yellow disk. The badge is shown in the fly of the state flag that was adopted in 1870, and revised in 1953. At the time of the badge's adoption, the colonial governor, Frederick Weld, wrote:

This Colony at its commencement was usually known as the Swan River Settlement, and the Black Swan is represented upon its seal, and has always been considered as its special badge, or cognizance.

The swan sits on a rippled blue and white base to depict it in its natural state, swimming on an estuary or lake.

The crown represents the monarchy in Australia, and the black and gold torse supporting the crown shows the colours of the state. A torse usually shows the principle colour and metal of the shield (blue and white), but in this case, the black and gold colours that have historically been associated with Western Australia since the adoption of the colonial badge in 1870 are shown.

The kangaroo paw (Anigozanthos manglesii) flower is the official floral emblem of Western Australia, adopted in 1960, and together with the black and gold torse framing the Crown indicates the honour bestowed upon the state by the grant of arms, and emphasises the sovereignty and independence of Western Australia.

The red kangaroo (Macropus rufus) is the largest kangaroo species, living in the state's inland and arid regions. Its natural habitat, combined with that of the black swan, covers almost the whole state and symbolically reflect the jurisdiction of the coat of arms. The red kangaroo is the species usually shown in Australian heraldry, for example the Australian and Northern Territory arms, although the New South Wales arms has a mythical gold kangaroo as a supporter.

The lack of any designs or emblems on the boomerangs held by the kangaroos indicates their role in representing all of the Aboriginal peoples of Western Australia.

Emblem used on 1955 Metropolitan Region Scheme

Although no motto was granted as part of the coat of arms, earlier heraldic-like emblems of Western Australia sometimes used a motto of Cygnis insignis, which means 'distinguished for swans', being a Latin pun on the swan emblem (cygnus being Latin for 'swan'). Insignis can also mean 'remarkable', 'outstanding' or 'conspicuous' – all adjectives pointing to the long-standing association between Western Australia and the emblematic black swan. An early 20th century magazine devoted to Westralian poetry named Cygnet was published between 1913 and 1915; and the Western Australian essayist Walter Murdoch wrote in 1930, quoting an unnamed poet:

Hail to Westralia!
Hail to its bigness!
Hail to its motto
"Cygnis insignis."

=== The symbolic black swan ===
'Westralia' is a contraction of 'Western Australia' often used self-referentially. Black swans have featured in much Westralian (or Western Australian) literature and art. The early colonist George Fletcher Moore included in his 1831 ballad So Western Australia for me the lines:

No lions or tigers are we dread to meet,
Our innocent quadrupeds hop on two feet;
No tithes and no taxes, we here have to pay,
And our geese are all swans, as some witty folk say.

D. H. Lawrence wrote nearly a century later in his 1925 story The Heritage:

Jack looked out at the road, but was much more enchanted by the full, soft river of heavenly blue water, on whose surface he looked eagerly for the black swans. He didn't see any.
"Oh yes! Oh, yes! You'll find em wild in their native state a little way up," said Mr Swallow.

The potency of the image of the black swan as a signifier of Westralian nationalism can be seen in this passage from Randolph Stow's Merry-go-Round in the Sea, published in 1965:

Perth was ancient ... and it was a very special city, cut off from other cities by sea and desert, so that there was not another city for two thousand miles. Among all Australian cities it had proved itself the most special, by a romantic act called the Secession, which the other cities had stuffily ignored.

Cinderella State, he thought, feeling indignant. That was the reason for the Secession. Because they had ignored his poor Cinderella State, all one million square miles of it.

Maybe after this war there'd be another war. Western Australia against the world, Black Swan flying.
'We shouldn't have gone to Parliament House,' his mother had remarked, 'it seems to have made you political.' ...

'When will Western Australia be free?' he wondered.

'I don't know,' said his mother. 'Perhaps when Bonnie Prince Charlie comes over.'

'Aww.' He grew disgusted at her flipancy.

— Randolph Stow, Merry-go-Round in the Sea, 1965

== Designer ==
The original heraldic artist who devised the arms is not known, although of the elements in the design have a long tradition of being used as symbols of the state, indicating some knowledge by the designer of Western Australian history and symbolism.

== Legal status ==
The Western Australian coats of arms are arms of dominion and sovereignty. The arms are included in the description in section 3 of the Armorial Bearings Protection Act 1979 as "Arms of any part of Her Majesty's Dominions". Arms of Dominion and Sovereignty are the symbols of intangible public authority which belong to independent states and are used by their representatives (such as government agencies) and leaders.

The royal warrant granting the arms states that they are "to be borne for Our said State on Seals, Shields, Banners, Flags, or Otherwise ... according to the Laws of Arms", and are "to be used on seals, shields, banners or otherwise according to the Laws of Arms." These laws are derived from medieval English civil law, and relate to the authority to grant arms, and the regulation of their use, although the enforceability of these laws in Western Australia is unclear.

In 1979, the Western Australian Parliament passed the Armorial Bearings Protection Act 1979, which patriated the Law of Arms to some degree regarding the Western Australian state arms, although rather obliquely. The main purpose of the act is to prohibit the unauthorised reproduction of images of the royal arms or the arms "of any part of Her Majesty’s Dominions".

== See also ==
- Black swan emblems and popular culture
- Government of Western Australia

== Sources ==
- Bennett, Bruce; Grono, William, eds. (1979). Wide Domain: Western Australian Themes and Images. Sydney: Angus & Robertson. OCLC 6942191.
  - Durack, M. "The Governor's Ball". In Bennett & Grono (1979), p. 47.
  - Lawrence, D. H. "The Heritage". In Bennett & Grono (1979), p. 63.
  - Murdoch, W. "On Pioneering". In Bennett & Grono (1979), p. 66.
- Fox-Davies, Arthur Charles (1909). A Complete Guide to Heraldry. London: T. C. & E. C. Jack. LCCN 09023803. OCLC 1042385787. OL 7101030M. Wikidata Q19020618.
