= Giovanni Capula =

Giovanni Capula was an italian architect of the 13th–14th century.

== Biography ==
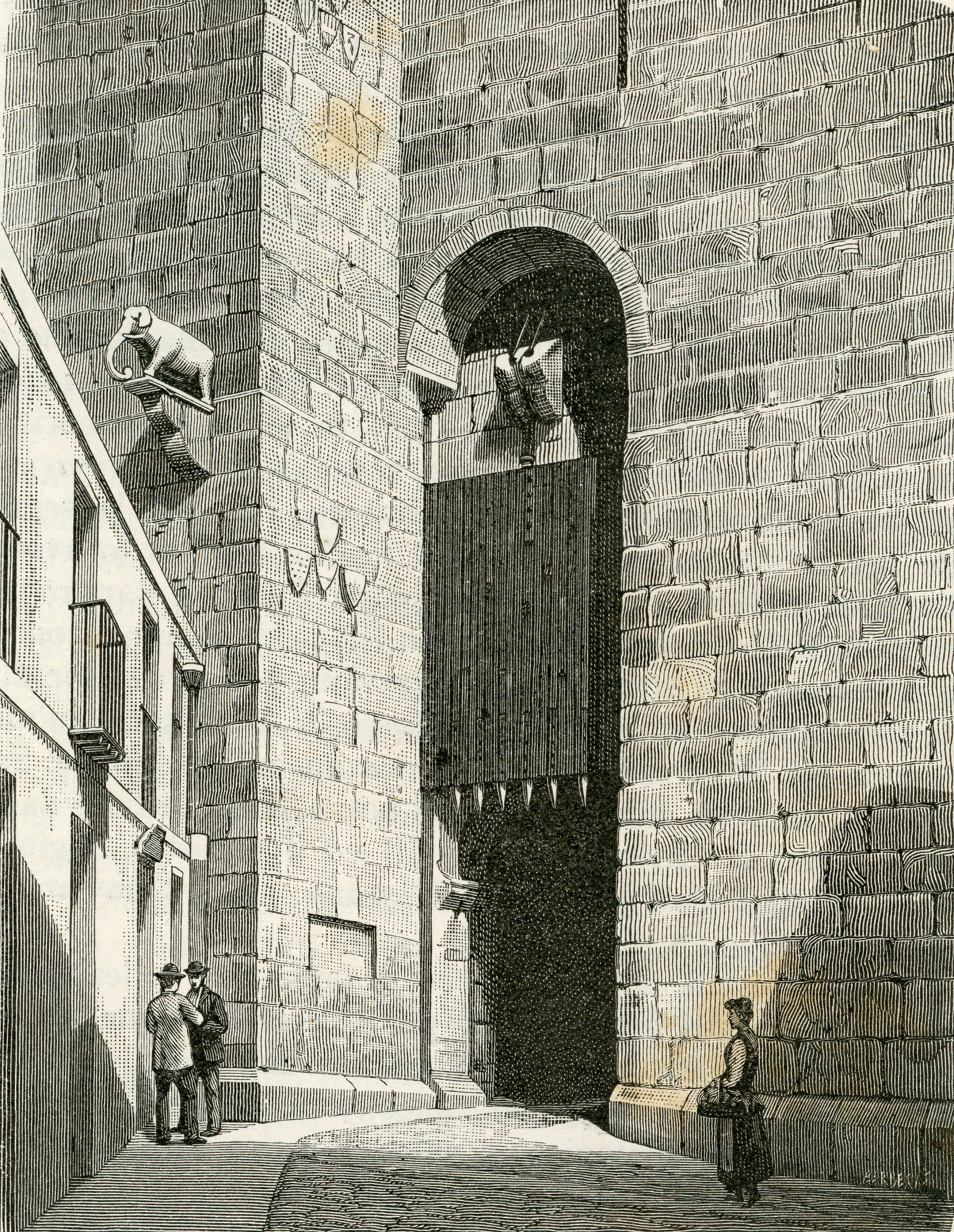
Tower of the Elephant

Little is known about him, the inscriptions of the Tower of San Pancrazio and the Tower of the Elephant of Cagliari, where he's defined Architector optimus, are the only direct sources available. For Dionigi Scano it was of Sardinian origin, being his surname (Capula) often found "in the toponymy and topography" of Sardinia. According to Salvatore Rattu he was specifically from Cagliari.

On the other hand, his training as an architect is clearer, which is certainly Tuscan, as evidenced by the style of his works.

== Works ==
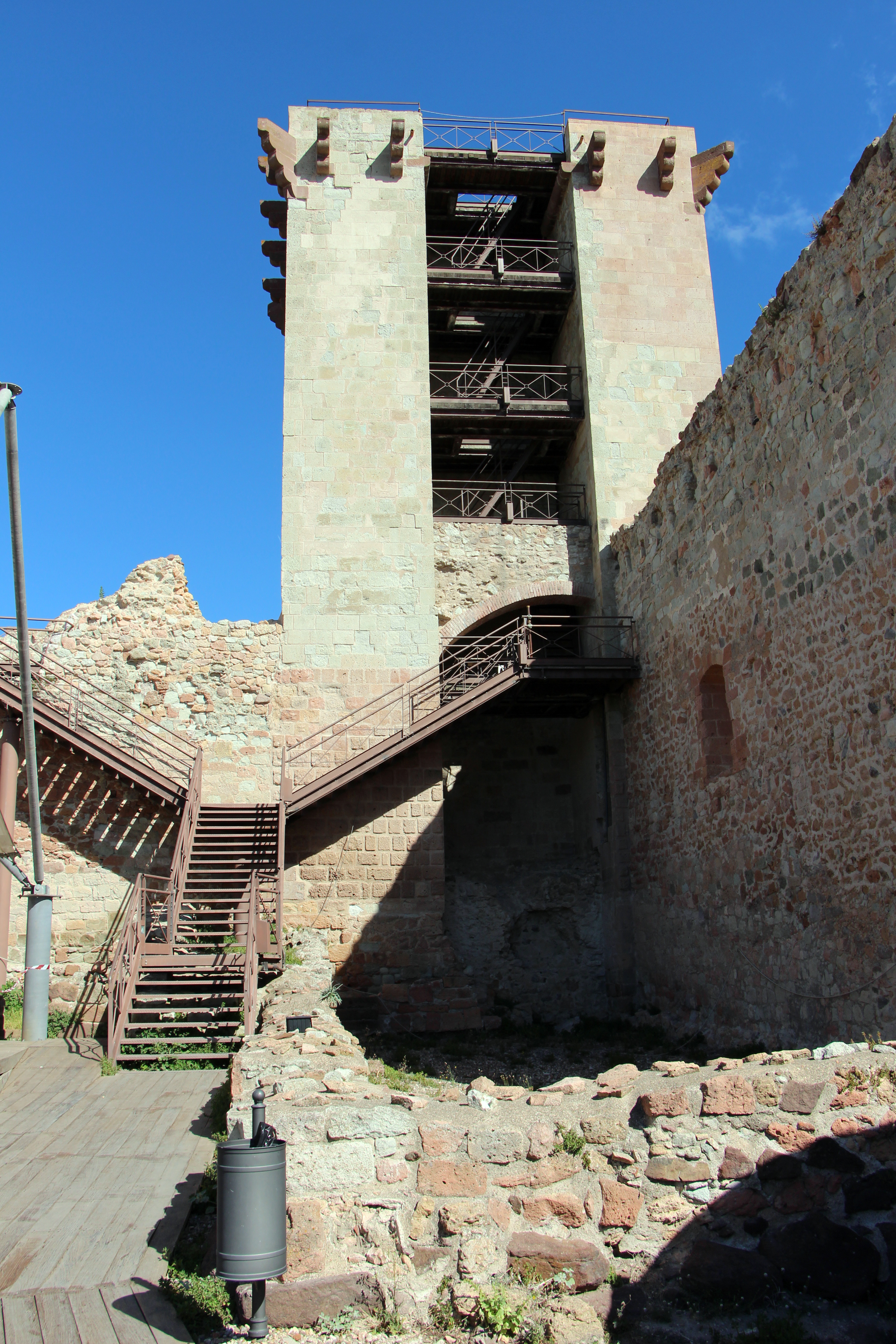
Main tower of Serravalle castle

The Tower of San Pancrazio of (1305), the Tower of the Elephant (1307) and the Tower of the Eagle (or Tower of the Lion), today incorporated in the Palace Boyl, are certainly attributable to Capula. Foiso Fois hypothesized that the main tower of the castle of Serravalle in Bosa should also be included in his works.

== Bibliography ==
- Dizionario Biografico degli Italiani - Volume 19 (1976) - CAPULA, Giovanni, di Renata Serra
