= Flag of the Australian Capital Territory =

Australian Capital Territory
- Use: Civil and state flag
- Proportion: 1:2
- Adopted: 25 March 1993
- Design: A vertical 1:2 bicolour of blue (charged with the Southern Cross) and gold (charged with a modified Coat of arms of the city of Canberra)
- Designed by: Ivo Ostyn

The current flag of the Australian Capital Territory was officially adopted by the Australian Capital Territory Legislative Assembly in 1993.

The flag differs from the Australian state flags as it is not a defaced Blue Ensign. It is similar in design to the flag of the Northern Territory. The flag uses the Canberra city colours of blue and gold (which also happen to be the heraldic colours of Australia). The Southern Cross appears as five white stars on a blue panel at the hoist, whilst in the centre of the goldfield in the fly is the modified Coat of arms of the city of Canberra. The flag was based on a design by Ivo Ostyn.

== History and adoption ==
The former flag of the city of Canberra was used unofficially for the Australian Capital Territory, until an official flag was adopted.

Even though the Australian Capital Territory has existed since 1909 and was given self-government in 1989, it had never had a flag of its own. In 1988 and 1992 community competitions for a proposed new flag were held, in which artists and residents of the ACT could put forth their designs for the new flag. The 1988 competition, undertaken by radio station 2CC, was won by then-Chisholm resident Ivo Ostyn with a representation of the then-recently erected flagpole of New Parliament House in green within a yellow circle on a green background. The 1992 competition was undertaken by newspaper The Canberra Times.

In 1993, following a 1992 motion by Opposition leader Trevor Kaine, the ACT Government commenced a process to develop and select an ACT flag. The ACT Government selected four options and surveyed the public between 19 February and 5 March 1993 to find the public's preference.

The Southern Cross and modified form of the coat of arms received 12,624 votes compared to a stylised Brindabella range which received 10,681 votes. A motion in the Legislative Assembly to declare the flag to be the flag of the ACT was resolved in the affirmative at midday, 25 March 1993. The flag selected was designed by Ivo Ostyn, who had won the 1988 design competition and had been involved in the 1992–1993 process. In later years Ostyn spoke against his creation, indicating his preference for a simpler flag that did not bear the coat of arms.

In 2020, the ACT Government commenced a process to develop a new coat of arms for the ACT. The development of a territory coat of arms will not automatically replace the coat of arms that appears on the current flag.

A survey form for selecting the ACT flag, distributed by the ACT Government. Document courtesy of the ACT Heritage Library.

== See also ==
- Coat of arms of the city of Canberra
- List of Australian flags
