= Torre di San Pancrazio =

Coordinates: 39°13′17″N 9°07′02″E

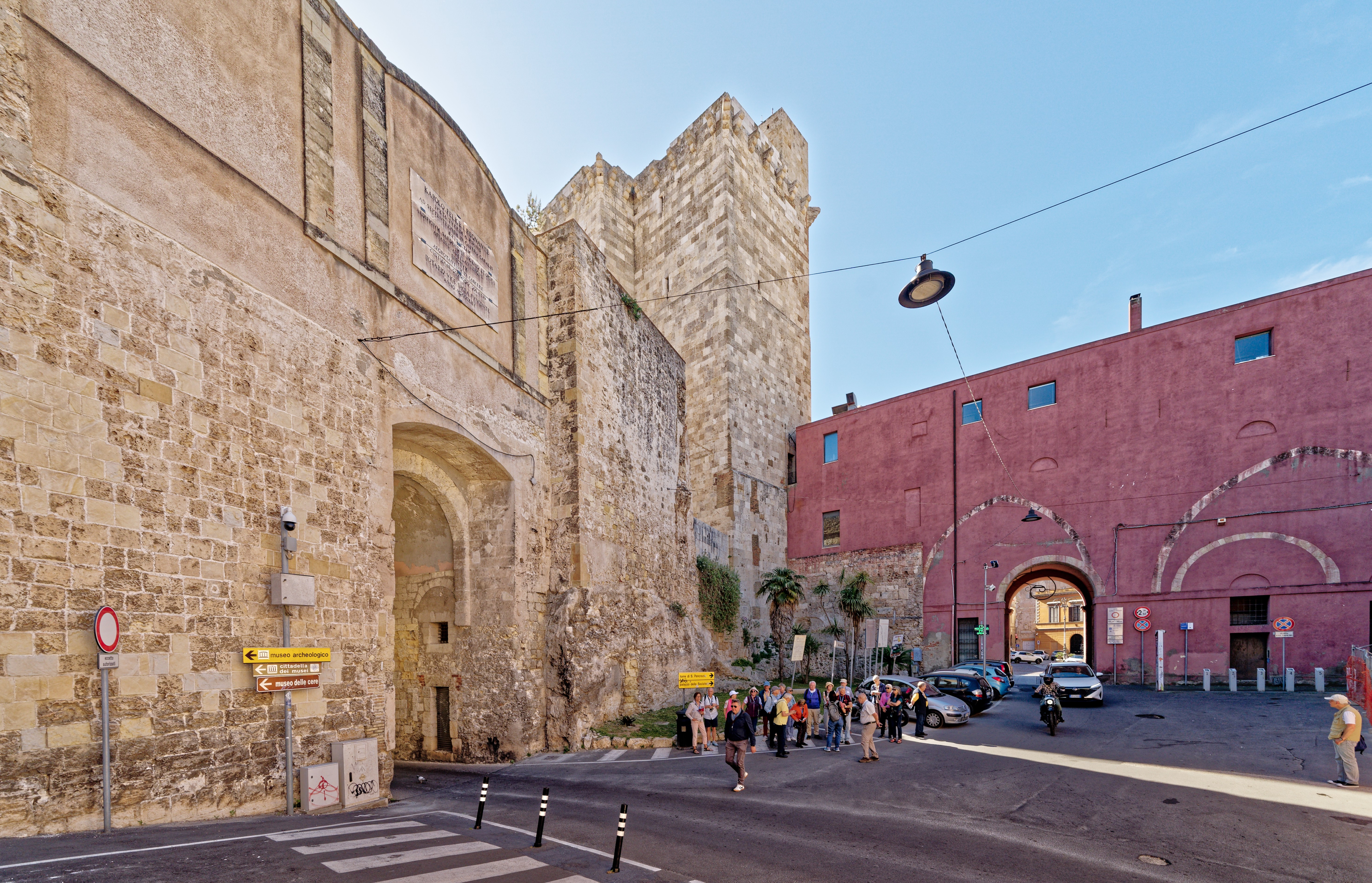
Gate and tower of San Pancrazio

The Torre di San Pancrazio (in Sardinian language: sa turri de Santu Francau) is a medieval tower in Cagliari, southern Sardinia, Italy. It is located in the Castello historical quarter of the city.

The tower was built in 1305, during the Pisan domination of the city, by the Sardinian architect Giovanni Capula, who designed also the Torre dell'Elefante two years later, as well as the Torre dell'Aquila, partly destroyed in the 18th century and now incorporated in Palazzo Boyl. The tower was part of the city's fortifications built against imminent Aragonese invasion of the island. The tower was built in white limestone from the nearby Colle di Bonaria, with walls up to 3 metres thick. It has also a gate, that, together with that of the Torre dell'Elefante, is still the main entrance to Castello.

During the Aragonese rule, the edifice was modified and used as a jail. It was restored in 1906, with the reopening of some sections which had been covered by other buildings.

== Sources ==
- AA. VV. (October 1999). Cagliari - Monumenti aperti. Tipografia Doglio.
