= Torre dell'Elefante =

Tower in Cagliari, Sardinia, Italy

Coordinates: 39°13′05″N 9°06′54″E

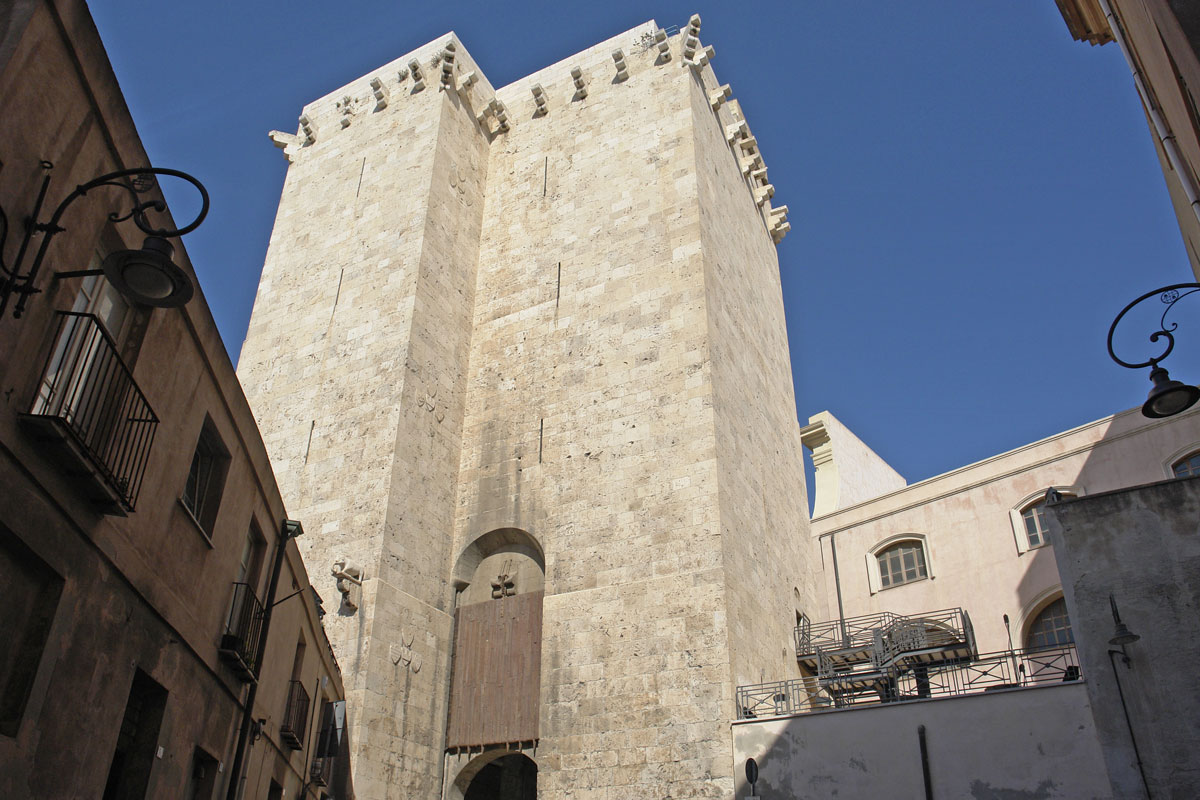
The Tower seen from the gate side.

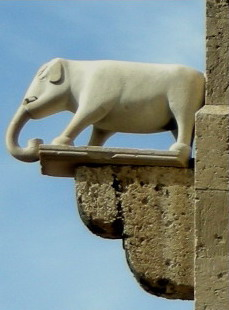
The sculpture from which the tower's name derives.

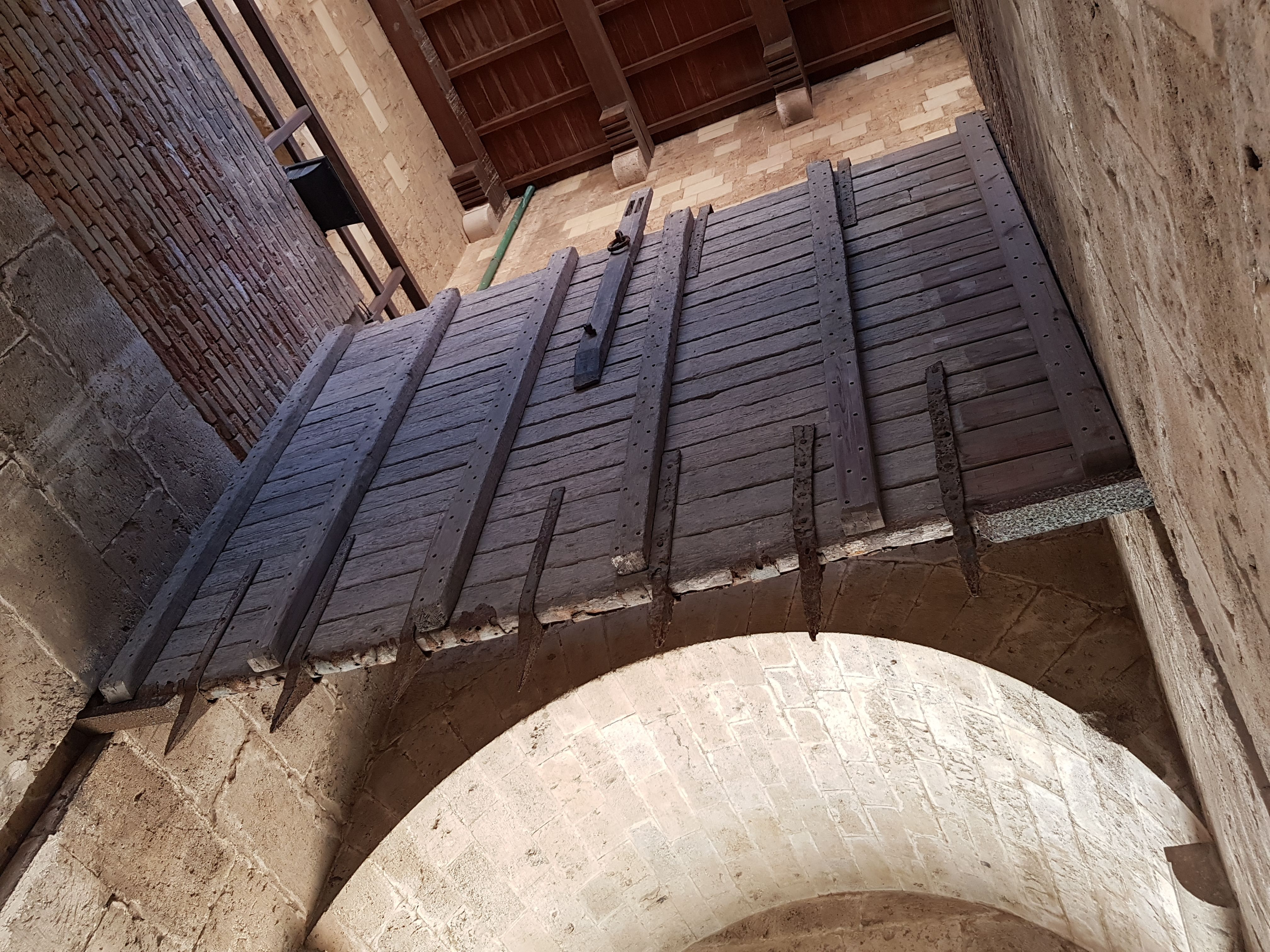
The inner portcullis of the tower.

The Torre dell'Elefante ("Tower of the Elephant") is a medieval tower in Cagliari, southern Sardinia, Italy. It is located in the Castello historical quarter of the city.

== History ==
The tower was built in 1307, during the Pisan domination of the city, by the Sardinian architect Giovanni Capula, who had also designed the Torre di San Pancrazio two years earlier, as well as the Torre dell'Aquila, partly destroyed in the 18th century and now incorporated in Palazzo Boyl. The tower was part of the city's fortifications in view of the imminent Aragonese invasion of the island, but was damaged in 1708 by English bombing, in 1717 by Spanish cannons, and finally lost its top part in 1793 during a French attack.

In 1328, the north side of the tower was closed to create residences and storage. During the Spanish age, the building was also used as a prison, and its doors would show the severed heads of the prisoners who had undergone the death penalty in the nearby plazuela (the current Piazza Carlo Alberto). As part of this phenomenon, in the second half of the 17th century, the head of Marquis Cea was hung for several years, as he had been involved in the homicide of the vice-king Camarassa.

In 1906, under the works of engineer Dionigi Scano, there was a restoration project with the aim of bringing the tower back to its original appearance, particularly by opening up the side which had been walled during the Aragonese period.

== Description ==
The tower was built on three sides in white limestone from the nearby Colle di Bonaria; another side was open, following the traditional Pisan style, and featured four floors of wooden galleries. The entrance was heavily defenced with three thick doors and two grates. For defending from above, there was a set of shelves to hold a wooden structure. The tower also has a gate, which, together with that of the Torre di San Pancrazio, is still the main entrance to the "Castello" quarter of Cagliari.

Its height reaches roughly 31 metres, up to 35 counting the very top. From the side of via Cammino Nuovo, it reaches a height of 42 metres.

Coming from via Università or from Cammino Nuovo, at the base of the tower next to the door, one can observe an engraved stone stating when the tower was built and by whom. Further up, several crests from the 14th century can be noticed, including the emblem of the city, along with a shelf on the wall which presents a small sculpture of an elephant (chosen as a Pisan symbol).
