= Bruce Bennett (academic) =

Australian literary scholar (1941–2012)

Bruce Harry Bennett AO FAHA (23 March 1941, Perth – 14 April 2012) was an Australian specialist in Australian literary studies. A Rhodes Scholar, his professional career was spent largely at the University of Western Australia where he was also director of the Centre for Studies in Australian Literature.

== Awards and recognition ==
Bennett's biography of Peter Porter won the Western Australian Premier's Book Award for non-fiction.

He was elected a Fellow of the Australian Academy of the Humanities in 1995 and was made an Officer of the Order of Australia in 1993 for "service to education and to Australian literature". He was awarded a Centenary Medal in 2001.

== Selected works ==
- Bruce, Bennett, ed. (1981). Cross Currents: Magazines and Newspapers in Australian Literature, Melbourne: Longman Cheshire.
- Bennett, Bruce (1991), Spirit in exile, Peter Porter and His Poetry, Oxford University Press, ISBN 978-0-19-554970-6
- Bennett, Bruce; Strauss, Jennifer, eds. (1998). The Oxford Literary History of Australia. Melbourne: Oxford University Press. ISBN 978-0-19-553737-6.
- Bennett, Bruce (2002), Australian Short Fiction: A History, University of Queensland Press, ISBN 978-0-7022-3301-2
