= Flag of Western Australia =

Western Australia
- Use: Civil and state flag
- Proportion: 1:2
- Adopted: 3 November 1953; 73 years ago
- Design: A British blue ensign with the State Badge in the fly

The state flag of Western Australia consists of a Blue Ensign defaced with the badge of the state. Adopted in 1953 to replace a similar design used from the time when the state was still a British colony, it has been the flag of Western Australia since 3 November of that year. The design of the present flag entailed reversing the direction of the black swan so that it faced towards the hoist. This was done in order to adhere to vexillological convention. Western Australia's flag is similar to the flags of the other five Australian states, which are also Blue Ensigns with their respective state badges. When flown with those state flags and the national flag, it is sixth in the order of precedence. This is indicative of its position on the Commonwealth Coat of Arms.

== History ==
The first confirmed European sighting of the western coast of Australia was made by the Dutch East India Company in the early 1600s. During an expedition in January 1697 to what is now Cottesloe, Willem de Vlamingh observed black swans in habitation at the estuary of the river there. He consequently named this body of water the Swan River (Zwaanenrivier in Dutch). However, the Dutch abandoned aspirations to annex the area, having discerned poor prospects for trade or colonisation. The British later established settlements at Fremantle and Perth in June 1829. These were collectively called the Swan River Colony.

The black swan soon became the unofficial symbol of the territory. For instance, it was depicted on its banknotes, which began circulating several years after the establishment of the colony. The bird was also featured on the Swan River Guardian, the settlement's first newspaper, as well as the inaugural issue of the Western Australian Government Gazette. Both of these were first printed in 1836. It was subsequently portrayed on the first postage stamps issued by the colony in 1854.

The flag used from 1870 until 1953.

An Order in Council was promulgated on 17 August 1869, instructing British colonial governors to fly the British ensign defaced with the coat of arms or badge of the territory. On 3 January of the following year, Frederick Weld, the Governor of Western Australia, put forward a proposed design of the badge that depicted a black swan on a yellow backdrop. His reasoning for this sketch was that the colony "at its commencement was usually known as the Swan River Settlement, and the Black Swan is represented upon its seal, and has always been considered as its special badge, or cognizance". The design was officially confirmed in a despatch bearing the date of 27 November 1875 by his successor, William C. F. Robinson. It was retained as the flag of the new state of Western Australia after the Federation of Australia in 1901.

Representatives from the College of Arms in London noted in 1936 that the direction of the swan was out of place. Vexillological convention dictates that all objects on a flag should face towards the hoist, which is the "point of honour". However, nothing was done to address this irregularity until the run-up to the royal visit in 1954. The issue was brought before the Parliament of Western Australia and the direction of the swan was corrected on 3 November 1953.

== Design ==
=== Description ===
The flag of Western Australia has an aspect ratio of 1:2. (Note: The official proportions of the flag are a length of 1,800 mm and a width of 900 mm. However, the figures are divided by a factor of 900 so that both are whole numbers.) The official colour scheme, according to the website of the Government of Western Australia, follows the Pantone Matching System as indicated below. The colour numbers for the flag's black and white shades are not specified.

Western Australia flag colours
| Colour | Pantone | RGB values | Hex |
|---|---|---|---|
| Blue | 280 | 1-33-105 | #012169 |
| Red | 185 | 228-0-43 | #E4002B |
| Yellow | 109 | 255-209-0 | #FFD100 |

=== Symbolism ===
The colours and symbols of the flag carry cultural, political, and regional meanings. The Blue Ensign is a conspicuous symbol of Great Britain, Australia's mother country. Consequently, it is preserved on the flags of all six Australian states, with their badges in the fly being the sole difference between them. The black swan alludes to the state of Western Australia itself. It is native to the state, and lent its name to the Swan River Colony (the precursor to modern-day Western Australia). It was subsequently adopted as the bird emblem of the state on 25 July 1973. The black swan has come to be employed as a representation of "an Australian nationalistic identity against the English imperialist master", according to the author Rodney James Giblett.

== Protocol ==
Advice regarding flag etiquette is the responsibility of the state's Department of the Premier and Cabinet. When flown together with the flag of Australia and the other state and territorial flags, the flag of Western Australia is sixth in the hierarchical order (after the national flag and, in descending order of precedence, the flags of New South Wales, Victoria, Queensland, and South Australia). This reflects the position of its state badge on the shield of the Commonwealth Coat of Arms, where it appears as the fifth quarter on the second row.

The guidelines state that the flag is not to touch the ground, nor should it be flown on the same flagpole that displays another flag. It ought to be hoisted not before first light and lowered not later than dusk, unless the flag is illuminated at night. The only exception to this is if the state flag is flown at half-mast, in which case it is never to be flown throughout the night, regardless of whether it would be illuminated. It is not to be displayed in an inverted manner, even if this is intended to serve as a distress signal.

== Variants ==
Variant flags of Western Australia
| Variant flag | Usage |
|---|---|
| | Standard of the governor of Western Australia |
| | Proposed flag of the "Dominion of Westralia" (1934) |

== See also ==
- Flags of the governors of the Australian states
- List of Australian flags
