= South African Naval Ensign =

Naval ensign

- Use: Naval ensign
- Proportion: 2:3
- Adopted: 16 March 1998
- Design: A green cross on white with the South African flag in the canton

The South African Naval Ensign is a naval ensign used by ships of the South African Navy. A variant of the White Ensign, it features a green cross on white with the South African flag in the canton. South Africa has since 1922 had a variety of naval ensigns which have evolved into the current ensign adopted in 1994.

== History ==
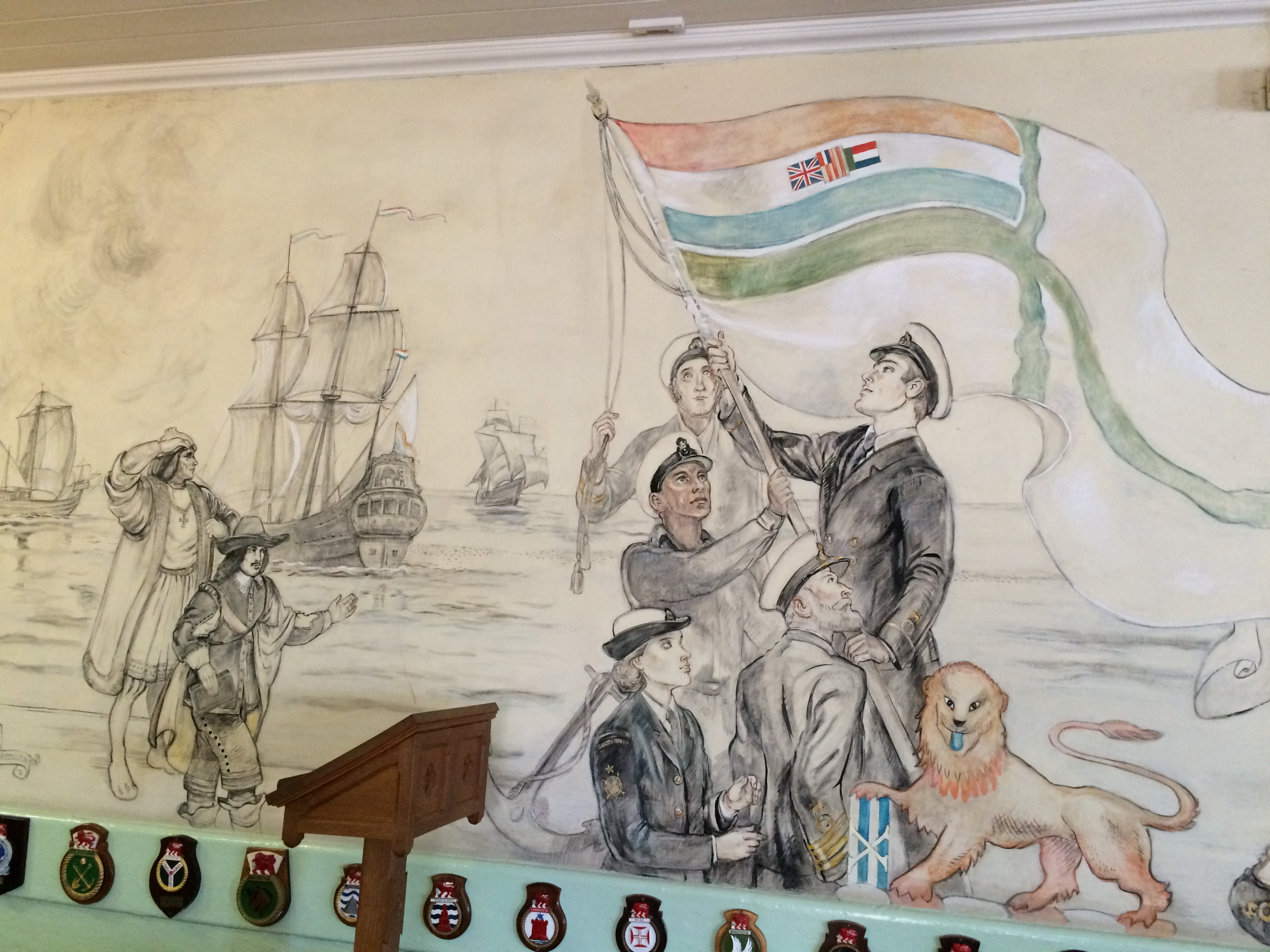
Ensign painting at the South African Naval Museum

At the formation of the South African Naval Service in 1922, South Africa used the British White Ensign as its naval ensign, with a Union Jack in the canton and a red St George's Cross. Meanwhile, the South African national flag was flown as a jack. In 1946, following the Second World War, South Africa began to use a solid white ensign without the cross and with the then-current South African flag in the canton. This design was recommended by Chief of the General Staff General Sir Pierre van Ryneveld to Prime Minister Jan Smuts and accepted on 6 December 1945, with notice of the new ensign appearing in the Government Gazette on 26 July 1946. The new flag was, unlike the national flag, in the 1:2 proportion, meaning the national flag had to be stretched. The ensign was found to be difficult to identify.

On 15 May 1951, Director-General of Naval Forces Commodore Frederick Dean OBE recommended a new ensign:

the national flag of the Union of South Africa with an upper hoist canton consisting of three equally wide horizontal stripes from top to bottom or orange, white and blue. The white stripe of the canton charged with a lion passant guardant Gules, supporting with the dexter paw four staves erect, alternatively Argent and Azure and banded Or, from the crest of the Coat of Arms of the Union of South Africa

It appears to have not found favour in naval circles and was, as such, never flown.

In 1952, a third ensign featured a dark green cross with the national flag in the canton. In order to accommodate the national flag in its standard 2:3 proportion, the ensign had the appearance of a Scandinavian cross. In 1959, a white fimbriation was added to separate the national flag from the cross. It is not known why the apartheid regime chose a green cross over the earlier red, Saint George's cross; but the Flemish and Dutch (from whom the ruling Afrikaners were descended) bore a green cross on white during the Third Crusade.

On 5 March 1981, the proportions of the ensign were changed to 2:3 and the naval badge (featuring the crest of the South African coat of arms on a dark blue representation of the layout of the Castle of Good Hope) was added to the lower quarter.

The ensign was updated to its current form in 1994, with the national flag in the canton updated and the naval badge removed. The colour of the cross was modified slightly to match the green on the national flag.

== Historical ensigns, jacks and colours ==
=== Naval ensigns and jacks ===
South African naval flags
Period	Ensign	Jack
1922–1928		
1928–1946		
1946–1951		
1951–1952 (approved but not used)		
1952–1959		
1959–1981		
1981–1994		
27 April 1994 – 11 November 1994		
1994–present		

=== Naval colours ===
South African naval colours
Period	Colour
1981-1994	
c. 1998	

== See also ==
- List of South African flags
