= Flag of the Nieuwe Republiek =

Second flag : 1905-1910

The flag of the Nieuwe Republiek was the official flag of this short-lived South African state from 1884 to 1888.

== History ==
The Nieuwe Republiek ('New Republic') was established in north-western Zululand by a few hundred Boer farmers in August 1884 after they signed a treaty with the Zulu king. By agreement with the neighbouring South African Republic, it was incorporated into the ZAR in July 1888.

The Volksraad (legislature) approved an official flag on 13 November 1884.

== Description ==
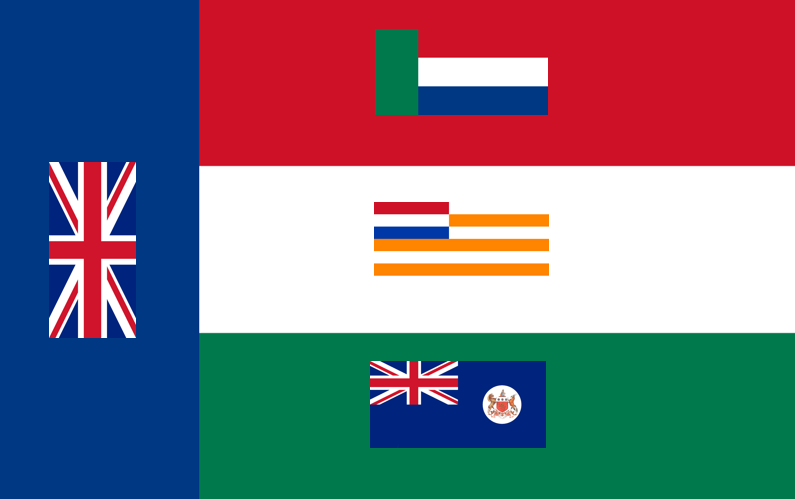
Alternative version of the Nieuwe Republiek flag that was never flown

The flag was evidently inspired by the 'Vierkleur' Flag of the South African Republic. The colours were simply re-arranged, so that the horizontal bands were red, white and green, and the vertical bar was blue. The Volksraad resolution specified that a small Union Jack should be placed on the blue, a small ZAR 'Vierkleur' on the red, a small Orange Free State flag on the white, and a small Cape Colony flag on the green. However, this was not done.

== Sources ==
- Burgers, A.P. (1997). Sovereign Flags over Southern Africa.
- Burgers, A.P. (2008). The South African Flag Book.
- Van Zyl, J.A. (1995). 'History of the Flags of South Africa before 1900' in SAVA Journal SJ 4/95.

== See also ==
- List of South African flags
- Flag of the Cape Colony
- Flag of Goshen
- Flag of Natal
- Flag of the Natalia Republic
- Flag of the Orange Free State
- Flag of the Orange River Colony
- Flag of South Africa
- Flag of the South African Republic
- Flag of Stellaland
- Flag of Transvaal
