= National symbols of South Africa =

Since unification in 1910, South Africa has used a range of national symbols to identify the country, such as coats of arms, official seals, flags, national anthems, and floral, bird, animal, and other emblems.

== Coats of arms ==
- 1910 coat of arms – granted by King George V in 1910, and used until 2000.
- 2000 coat of arms – introduced by the Mbeki administration in 2000.

== Seals ==
- Great Seal of the Union – authorised by King George V in 1910, and used until 1937 on state documents signed by the Governor-General.
- Royal Great Seal of the Union – authorised by the Royal Executive Functions and Seals Act 1934, and used until 1961 on state documents signed by the monarch on the advice of the South African government.
- Royal Signet of the Union – authorised by the Royal Executive Functions and Seals Act 1934, and used until 1961 on state documents signed by the monarch on the advice of the South African government.
- Governor-General's Great Seal – authorised by King George VI in 1937, and used until 1961 on state documents signed by the Governor-General.
- Seal of the Republic – authorised by the Republic of South Africa Constitution Act 1961, and used on state documents signed by the State President (from 1994 President). The use of the seal has not been a constitutional requirement since 1997, but its use continues nevertheless.

== Flags ==
=== National ===
Flag of South Africa since 1994

- National Flag of the Union – authorised by the Union Flags and Nationality Act 1927, and introduced in 1928. Renamed the "National Flag of the Republic" in 1961, it was used until 1994.
- National Flag – the current flag, introduced in 1994.

=== Merchant ensign ===
- Red Ensign defaced with the shield of the coat of arms – authorised by the Admiralty in 1910, for use on South African-registered merchant ships, and also used as an unofficial "national flag". From 1912, the shield was placed on a white disc. The ensign was discontinued in 1960.
- Since 1960, the national flag has been used as the merchant ensign.

=== Civil ensign ===
- Blue Ensign defaced with the shield of the coat of arms – authorised by the Admiralty in 1910, for use on South African government vessels. Superseded by the National Flag of the Union.

=== Head of state's flag ===
- Union Jack defaced with the full coat of arms surrounded by acacia leaves and flowers – flown by the governor-general until 1931.
- Governor-General's flag – blue, displaying the royal crest between two ribands bearing the name of the country. Used from 1931 to 1961.
- State President's flag (1) – blue, displaying the national coat of arms below the letters SP. Used from 1961 to 1984.
- State President's flag (2) – orange, white, and blue triangles, displaying the national coat of arms below the letters SP. Used from 1984 to 1994.

== National anthem ==
- "God Save the King (Queen)" – used from 1910 to 1957.
- "Die Stem van Suid-Afrika" – used from 1938 to 1957 as joint national anthem with "God Save the King (Queen)"; from 1957 to 1994 as the sole national anthem; and from 1994 to 1997 as joint national anthem with "Nkosi sikelel' iAfrika". Elements of it are incorporated in the current South African national anthem.
- "Nkosi Sikelel' iAfrika" – used from 1994 to 1997 as joint national anthem with "Die Stem van Suid-Afrika". Elements of it are incorporated in the current South African national anthem.
- "National anthem of South Africa" – abridged versions of "Nkosi sikelel' iAfrika" and "Die Stem van Suid-Afrika", with altered words, combined into a single national anthem, and used since early 1997.

== National symbols ==
National symbols of South Africa
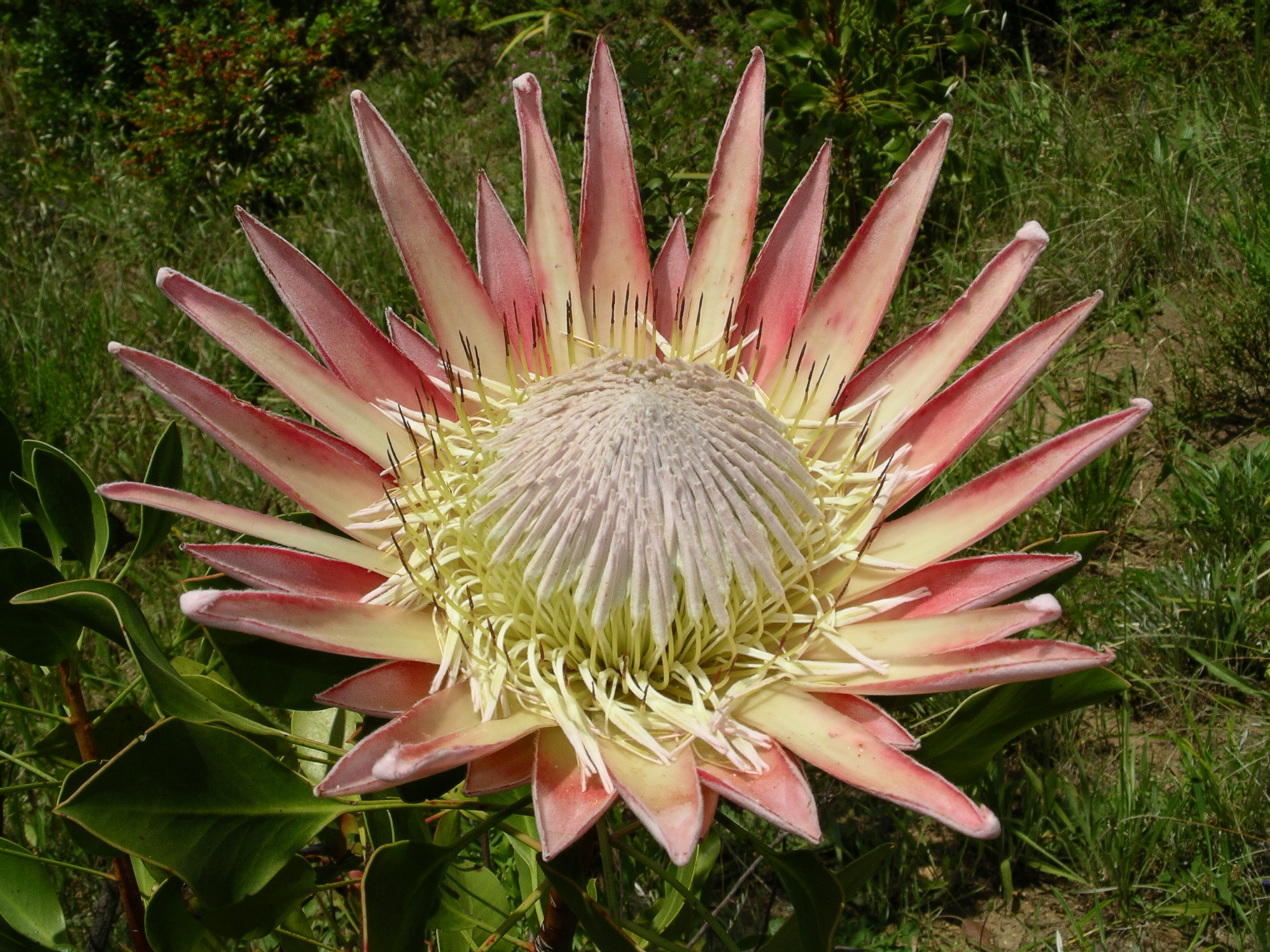
National flower:
King protea

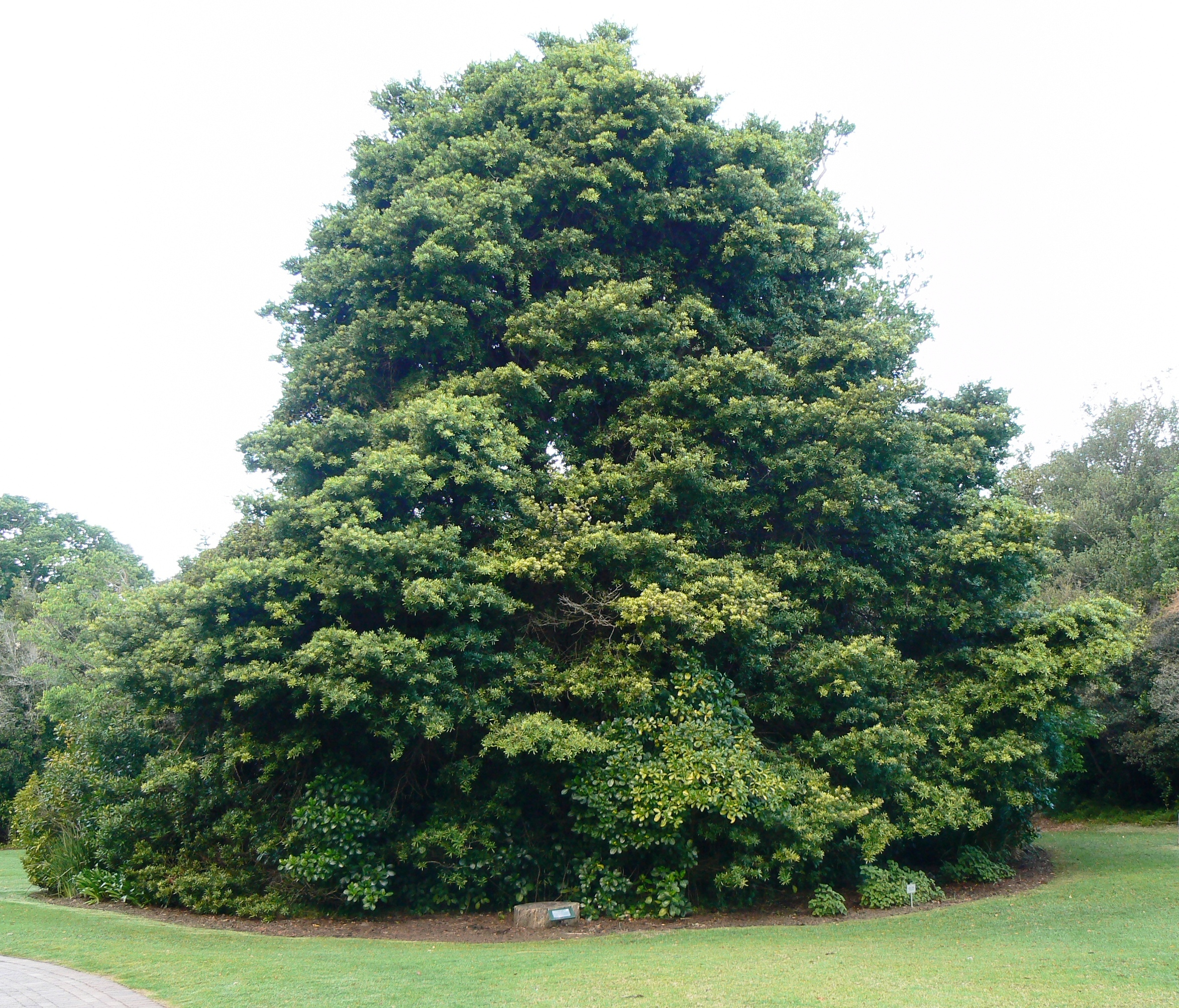
National tree:
Real yellowwood

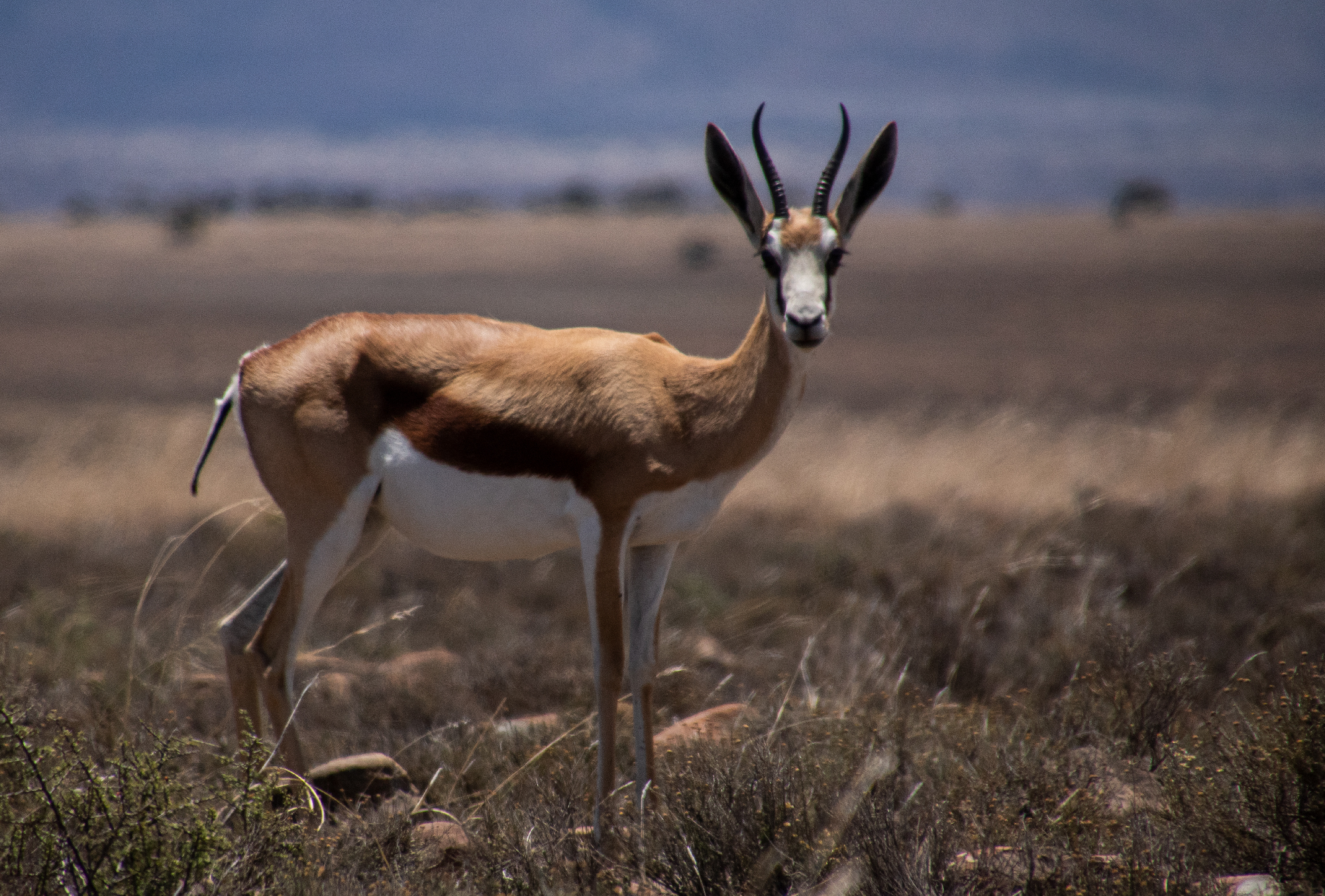
National animal:
Springbok

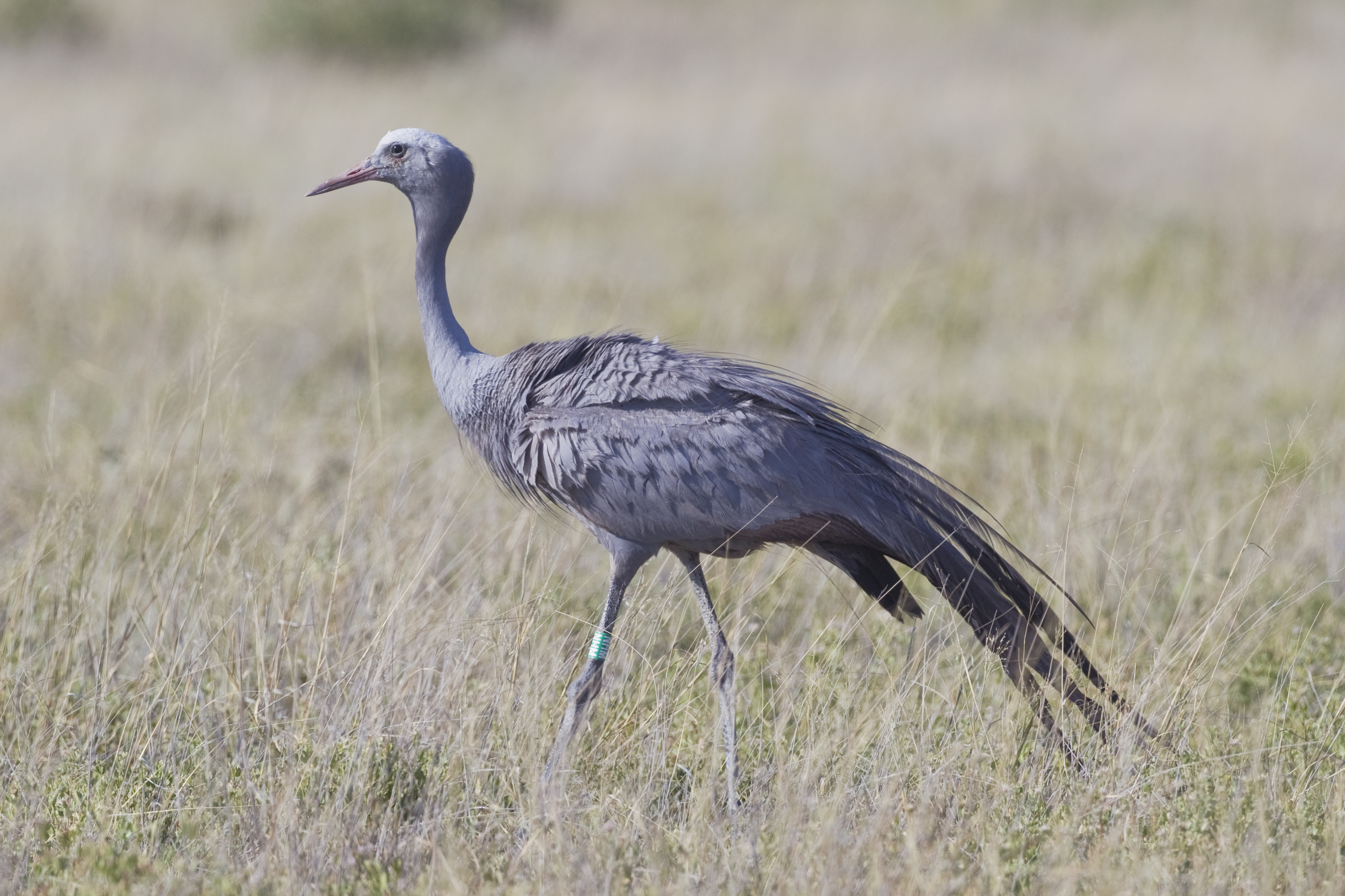
National bird:
Blue crane

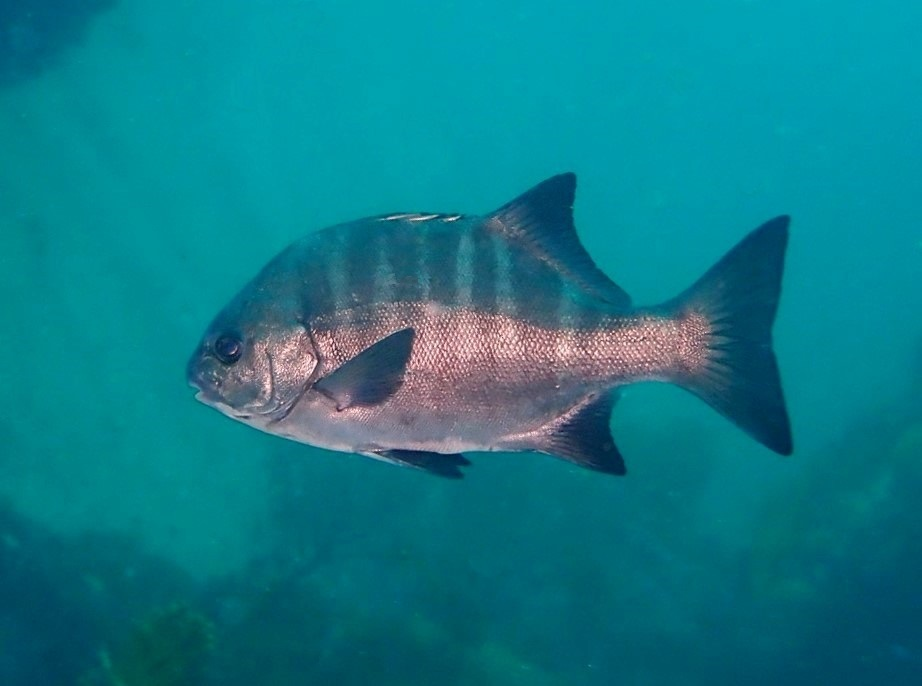
National fish:
Galjoen

== See also ==
- Coat of arms of South Africa
- Flag of South Africa
- List of South African flags
- National anthem of South Africa
- National flower of South Africa

== Bibliography ==
- Brownell, F.G. (1993). National and Provincial Symbols.
- Burgers, A.P. (2008). The South African Flag Book.
- Pama, C. (1965). Lions and Virgins.
