= Flag of Transvaal =

Official flag of the Transvaal colony in South Africa from circa 1903 to 1910

Flag of the Transvaal Colony

The Flag of Transvaal was the official flag of the Transvaal colony in South Africa from circa 1903 to 1910. It formed part of a system of colonial flags that was used throughout the British Empire. It was superseded by the flag of the Union of South Africa.

== History ==
In a series of decisions made in 1864, 1865, and 1869, the British government decided that every colony should have a distinctive badge, to be displayed on flags at sea. The governor was to display the badge in the centre of the Union Jack when travelling by sea; vessels owned by the colony's government were to display it in the fly of the Blue Ensign; and, with Admiralty permission, privately owned ships registered in the colony could display the badge in the fly of the Red Ensign. This system is still in operation in the remaining British overseas territories.

A flag badge was duly approved for the Transvaal Colony (formerly the South African Republic), shortly after it had been annexed to the British Empire in 1902. Although landlocked, the colony is believed to have used the defaced Blue Ensign on land.

== Description ==
The badge was circular, and showed a lion lying down in the veld. The lion was no doubt derived from the colony's new Public Seal, and it had also featured on the former South African Republic's coat of arms.

== Sources ==
- Brownell, F.G. (1993). National and Provincial Symbols.
- Burgers, A.P. (1997). Sovereign Flags over Southern Africa.
- Burgers, A.P. (2008). The South African Flag Book.
- Pama, C. (1965). Lions and Virgins.
- Weekes, N. (2008). Colonial Flag Badges : A Chronology.

== See also ==
- List of South African flags
- Flag of the Cape Colony
- Flag of Goshen
- Flag of Natal
- Flag of the Natalia Republic
- Flag of the Nieuwe Republiek
- Flag of the Orange Free State
- Flag of the Orange River Colony
- Flag of South Africa
- Flag of the South African Republic
- Flag of Stellaland
