= Flag of the Orange River Colony =

Orange River Colony
- Use: Civil and state flag, state ensign
- Proportion: 1:2
- Adopted: 1904

The flag of the Orange River Colony was the official flag of the Orange River Colony in South Africa from 1904 to 1910. It formed part of a system of colonial flags that was used throughout the British Empire. It was superseded by the Flag of the Union of South Africa.

== History ==
In a series of decisions made in 1864, 1865, and 1869, the British government decided that every colony should have a distinctive badge, to be displayed on flags at sea. The governor was to display the badge in the centre of the Union Jack when travelling by sea; vessels owned by the colony's government were to display it in the fly of the Blue Ensign; and, with Admiralty permission, privately owned ships registered in the colony could display the badge in the fly of the Red Ensign. This system is still in operation in the remaining British overseas territories.

A flag badge was duly approved for the Orange River Colony (formerly the Orange Free State republic), shortly after it had been annexed to the British Empire in 1902. It is unclear whether the landlocked colony actually used the defaced Blue Ensign.

== Description ==
The badge was circular, and showed a springbok standing on a grassy base. It was evidently derived from the colony's new Public Seal, which depicted the British royal arms and a landscape scene showing three springboks standing in the veld.

== Sources ==
- Brownell, F.G. (1993). National and Provincial Symbols.
- Burgers, A.P. (1997). Sovereign Flags over Southern Africa.
- Burgers, A.P. (2008). The South African Flag Book.
- Pama, C. (1965). Lions and Virgins.
- Weekes, N. (2008). Colonial Flag Badges : A Chronology.

== See also ==
- List of South African flags
- Flag of the Cape Colony
- Flag of Goshen
- Flag of Natal
- Flag of the Natalia Republic
- Flag of the Nieuwe Republiek
- Flag of the Orange Free State
- Flag of South Africa
- Flag of the South African Republic
- Flag of Stellaland
- Flag of Transvaal
