= Flag of Goshen =

Historical flag

The flag of Goshen was the official flag of the short-lived South African territory of Goshen from 1883 to 1885. It is currently used in the Cenotaph Hall of the Voortrekker Monument.

== History ==
The state of Goshen arose from a war in Bechuanaland in 1881–82. It was established by a group of mercenaries who had fought in the war. Goshen's independence was short-lived, though, as it was occupied by British forces in March 1885, and was later incorporated into British Bechuanaland.

The executive council resolved on 5 March 1883 that the flag which they had flown during the war would be the official flag of their new state.

== Description ==
The flag was evidently modelled on the 'vierkleur' Flag of the South African Republic, as well as the tricolor of the German Empire. The official description was:

Green against the hoist, and across from it black, white and red below each other.

== Sources ==
- Burgers, A.P. (1997). Sovereign Flags over Southern Africa.
- Burgers, A.P. (2008). The South African Flag Book.
- Ploeger, J. (1988). ' Die vlag en wapen van die Republiek Land Goosen' in Africana Notes & News (March 1988).

== See also ==
- List of South African flags
- Flag of the Cape Colony
- Flag of Natal
- Flag of the Natalia Republic
- Flag of the Nieuwe Republiek
- Flag of the Orange Free State
- Flag of the Orange River Colony
- Flag of South Africa
- Flag of the South African Republic
- Flag of Stellaland
- Flag of Transvaal
