= South African Defence Force Ensign =

Military flag

- Use: Military
- Proportion: 2:3
- Adopted: 1981
- Design: Ensign
- Designed by: SADF

The South African Defence Force Ensign was the flag used by the South African Defence Force (SADF) as a unified flag for all of the South African Defence Forces after they had previously only used their own individual flags. It consisted of a green ensign with the flag of South Africa (known as the "Oranje, Blanje, Blou") in canton with a crest consisting of three symbols of the SADF forces inside an outline of the Castle of Good Hope. The flag was adopted in 1981 but was replaced in 1994 following the adoption of a new flag and the reorganization of the armed forces in South Africa as the South African National Defence Force but was still used for a few months after.

== History ==
From 1951, the individual branches of the South African Defence Force had their own flags and ensigns but there was no unified flag to symbolise the whole of the SADF. On 21 March 1981, the Chief of the South African Defence Force approved a design for the forces' unified ensign. The official description of it was "A rectangular green flag in the proportion of two to three; within the upper hoist quarter the national flag of South Africa, with a white fimbriation; and in the lower fly quarter the emblem of the South African Defence Force, to wit: On a white ground plan of the Castle of Good Hope, a dark blue erect anchor surmounted by a horizontal pair of steel blue wings and overall, a pair of orange swords in saltire; the whole within a border, the inner half of which is dark green and the outer half gold".

The SANDF replacement ensign, used until 2003.

In 1994 following the fall of apartheid and election of Nelson Mandela as President of South Africa, the SADF was reorganised merging them with the African National Congress's Umkhonto we Sizwe, the Pan Africanist Congress's Azanian People's Liberation Army and the Self-Protection Units of the Inkatha Freedom Party to create the South African National Defence Force on 27 April 1994. The ensign, following the election of Nelson Mandela in March, initially remained the same with the Oranje, Blanje, Blou in the ensign but was viewed as obsolete. In July 1994, a new ensign was designed which retained much of the original ensign except for substituting the new flag of South Africa in place of the Oranje, Blanje, Blou. The new ensign replaced the old one in its first parade in Pietersburg on 11 November 1994.
