= List of South African flags =

This article lists the flags of the various colonies and states that have existed in South Africa since 1652, as well as other flags pertaining to South Africa, including governmental, military, police and provincial flags.

== Overview ==
The following flags have been used as the national flag of the Union of South Africa and the Republic of South Africa:

Flag	Date	Description
	Flag of South Africa; 1994–present	Two horizontal bands of chilli red (top) and blue (bottom) with a black triangle at the hoist, over all a green horizontal (pall) (Y-shape), fimbriated white against the red and blue and gold against the black.
	Flag of South Africa; 1928–1994	Orange, white, and blue horizontal stripes, on the white stripe, a backwards Union Flag towards the hoist, the Orange Free State flag hanging vertically and the flag of the South African Republic, towards the fly. Used for both the Union and later Republic of South Africa.
	1912–1928	A British Red Ensign with the shield of the coat of arms of the Union of South Africa on a white roundel.
	1910–1957	Blue field on which the Cross of Saint Andrew counterchanged with the Cross of Saint Patrick, over all the Cross of Saint George fimbriated.
	1910–1912	A British Red Ensign with the shield of the coat of arms of the Union of South Africa.

== History ==
=== Historical flags (1652–1928) ===
- Many flags were used in South Africa prior to political unification in 1910.
- The original Dutch East India Company colony at the Cape of Good Hope (1652–1795) flew the Dutch flag, with the VOC logo in the centre. This flag was also flown during the period of Batavian Republic rule (1803–06).
- The Boer Republics, i.e. the Orange Free State (1854–1902), the South African Republic (1857–1902), Stellaland (1882–85), Goshen (1883–85), the Nieuwe Republiek (1884–88), and the Klein Vrystaat (1886–1891) had their own flags. Several derived from the Dutch flag.
- The British colonies that existed in the 19th century flew the British flags, and from the early 1870s some, i.e. Natal, Cape Colony, and later the Orange River Colony and the Transvaal, added their own colonial flag badges.
- The Union of South Africa, formed in 1910, initially used a Red Ensign defaced with a badge depicting the Union coat of arms. The first South African national flag, introduced in 1928, superseded it.

Flag	Date	Use	Description
	1652–1795	The Prince's Flag	A horizontal triband of orange, white, and blue.
	1652–1795	States Flag	A horizontal triband of red, white, and blue. The blue is a lighter shade than that of the current national flag.
	1652–1795	Flag of the Vereenigde Oost-Indische Compagnie	
	1652–1795, 1803–1806	Flag of the Vereenigde Oost-Indische Compagnie	
	1795–1801	Flag of the Kingdom of Great Britain	The Flags of England and Scotland superimposed.
	1801–1803	Union Jack	The flag was used in the occupation of the Dutch Cape Colony until 1803, only to be reintroduced in 1806.
	1803–1806	Flag of the Batavian Republic	A horizontal triband of red, white, and blue with the Republic’s emblem in the canton.
	1839–1843	Flag of the Natalia Republic	
	1857–1902	Flag of the Orange Free State	
	1857–1874, 1875–1877, 1881–1902	Flag of the South African Republic (Transvaal Republic)	('Vierkleur')
	1870–71	Flag of the Diggers' Republic	('Diamond flag')
	1870–71	Flag of the Diggers' Republic	('Klipdrift flag')
	1874–1875	Flag of the South African Republic (Transvaal Republic)	('Thomas François Burgers's Voortrekker flag'). A red saltire outlined in white on a dark blue field.
	1875–1910	Flag of Natal	
	1876–1910	Flag of the Cape Colony	A Blue Ensign defaced with the shield-of-arms of Cape Colony.
	1883–1885	Flag of Goshen	
	1883	Flag of Stellaland	
	1883–1885	Flag of Stellaland	
	1884–1888	Flag of the Nieuwe Republiek	
	1890–1891	Flag of Klein Vrystaat	
	1902–1910	Flag of the Orange River Colony	A Blue Ensign defaced with a springbok antelope in a disc.
	1904–1910	Flag of Transvaal	A Blue Ensign defaced with a disc showing a lion lying on an African plain with palm trees.
	1910–1912	Merchant flag of the Union of South Africa	
	1912–1951	Merchant flag of the Union of South Africa	
	1910–1928	State ensign and naval jack of the Union of South Africa	

=== National flags (1928–1994) ===
- The Hertzog administration introduced the flag after several years of political controversy. Approved by Parliament in 1927, it was first hoisted on 31 May 1928.
- The flag reflected the Union's predecessors. The basis was the Prince's Flag (royal tricolour) of the Netherlands, with the addition of a Union Jack to represent the Cape and Natal, the former Orange Free state flag, and the former South African Republic flag.
- Until 1957, the flag was flown subordinate to the British Union Jack.
- The flag remained unchanged when South Africa became a republic on 31 May 1961.

Flag	Date	Use	Description
	1910–1957	Flag of the Union of South Africa	The flag was a co-official flag until 1957 when the flag of the Union of South Africa became the sole official flag.
	1928–1982	Flag of the Republic/Union of South Africa	The flag using a darker shade of "Union" blue common before the early 1980s.
	1982–1994	Flag of the Republic of South Africa	The flag using a lighter shade of "Solway" blue as specified by the South African government in 1982.

=== Homeland flags (1966–1994) ===
- Nine of the ten Black 'homelands' which were created inside South African Federation under the apartheid system, had their own flags, i.e. Transkei (1966–94), Bophuthatswana (1973–94), Ciskei (1973–94), Gazankulu (1973–94), Venda (1973–94), Lebowa (1974–94), QwaQwa (1975–94), KwaZulu (1977–94), and KwaNdebele (1982–94). KaNgwane was the only homeland that never adopted its own distinctive flag, instead using the national flag of South Africa.
- All these flags became obsolete when South Africa reincorporated the homelands on 27 April 1994.

Flag	Date	Homeland	Description
	1966–1994	Transkei	
	1973–1994	Bophuthatswana	
	1973–1994	Ciskei	
	1973–1994	Gazankulu	
	1973–1994	Venda	
	1974–1994	Lebowa	
	1975–1994	QwaQwa	
	1977–1985	KwaZulu (1)	
	1982–1994	KwaNdebele	
	1985–1994	KwaZulu (2)	

=== Sporting flags (1992–1994) ===
As a result of the sporting boycott of South Africa over its policy of apartheid, South Africa did not participate in the Olympic Games between 1964 and 1988. The country was re-admitted to the Olympic movement in 1991. As a result of a dispute over what flag and national anthem to use following readmission, the team participated in the 1992 Summer Olympic Games under the National Olympic Committee flag. The flag consisted of a white field charged with grey diamond, which represented the countries mineral wealth, three cascading bands of blue, red and green, which represented the sea, the land and agriculture respectively and the Olympic rings. This flag was also used to represent the South African team at the 1992 Summer Paralympics. Team uniforms included the emblem of Olympic Committee of South Africa, which depicted Olympic rings surrounded by olive branches, with the name of the country above. The team would use Beethoven's "Ode to Joy" as its victory anthem at these games. At the 1994 Winter Games, South Africa participated under the flag of its Olympic committee.

Flag used to represent the South African team at the 1992 Summer Olympics and at the 1992 Summer Paralympics

Flag used to represent the South African team at the 1994 Winter Olympics

=== National flag (1994–present) ===
- South Africa was reconstituted as a unitary democratic state, with equal rights for men and women of all races in 1994. The old flag's long association with the apartheid era made it unacceptable for the new dispensation, and the State Herald, Frederick Brownell therefore designed a new flag. Approved by the Transitional Executive Council (TEC) on 20 March 1994, and officially authorised by state president F. W. de Klerk on 20 April 1994, it was officially hoisted a week later, on 27 April 1994.
- The new flag was intended as an interim measure, but it proved so popular that when the final Constitution was prepared in 1996, it became the permanent flag.

Flag	Date	Use	Description
	1994–present	Flag of the Republic of South Africa	

== Governmental flags ==
Governor of the Cape Colony, 1876–1910

Governor of the Natal Colony, 1905–1907

Governor of the Orange River Colony, 1902–1910

Governor of the Transvaal Colony, 1904–1910

High Commissioner for Southern Africa, 1907–1931

High Commissioner for Southern Africa, 1931–1968

Governor-General of South Africa, 1910–1931

Governor-General of South Africa, 1931–1952

Governor-General of South Africa, 1952–1961

State President of South Africa, 1961–1984

State President of South Africa, 1984–1994

=== Civil air ensign ===
1930s

== Military flags ==
=== South African Defence Force ===
1947–1981

1981–1994

=== South African National Defence Force ===
1994–2003

2003–present

=== National Defence Department ===
Joint Operations Division

Department of Military Veterans

=== South African Army ===
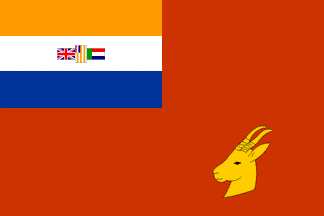
1951–1973

1973–1994

1994–2002

2002–2003

2003–present

=== South African Air Force ===
1920–1940

1940–1951

1951–1958

1958–1967

1967–1970 (approved but not used)

1970–1981

1981–1982

1982–1994

1994–2003

2003–present

=== South African Navy ===
Naval ensign, 1922–1946

Naval ensign, 1946–1951

Naval ensign, 1951–1952 (approved but not used)

Naval ensign, 1952–1959

Naval ensign, 1959–1981

Naval ensign, 1981–1994

Naval colour, 1981–1994

Naval ensign, 1994–present

Naval colour, c. 1998

== Police flags ==
=== South African Police ===
until 1994

=== South African Police Service ===
1995–present

== Provincial flags ==
=== 1910–1994 ===
Between 1910 and 1994, South Africa was divided into four provinces, Cape Province, Natal, Orange Free State and Transvaal. These provinces had their own coat of arms but not their own flags.

=== 1994–present ===
In April 1994, South Africa was divided into nine provinces. Each province was granted a coat of arms, in most cases designed by State Herald Frederick Brownell. Currently only one province, Mpumalanga, has adopted an official provincial flag, doing so in February 1996. The other eight provinces can be represented by white banners charged with their coats of arms.

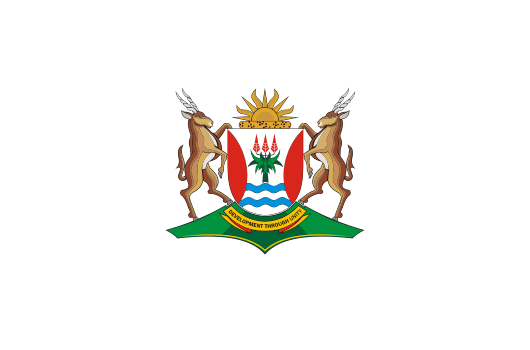
Banner of Eastern Cape

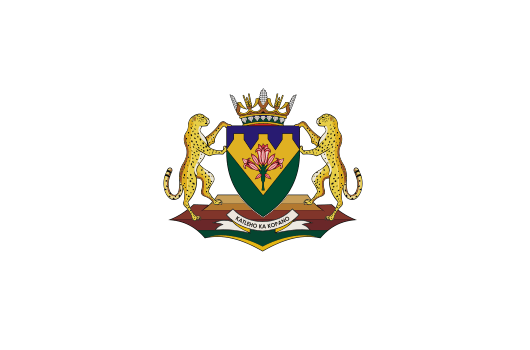
Banner of Free State Province

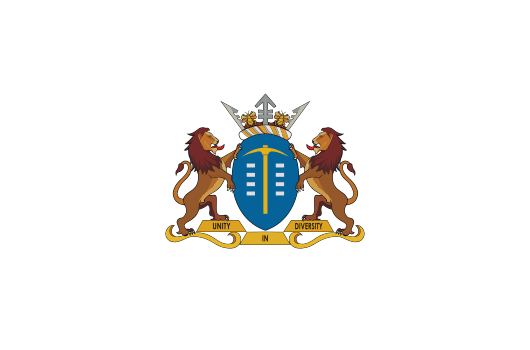
Banner of Gauteng

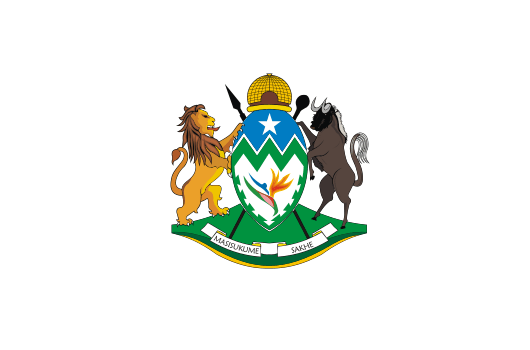
Banner of KwaZulu-Natal

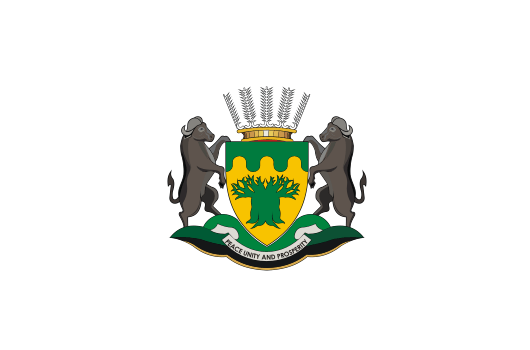
Banner of Limpopo

Flag of Mpumalanga

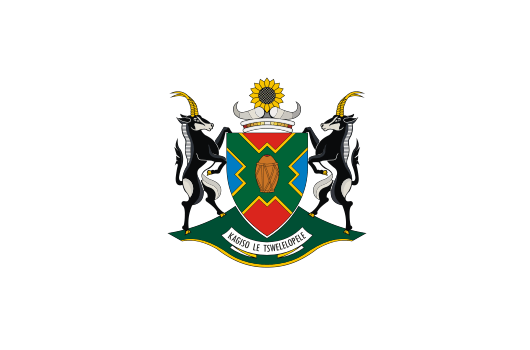
Banner of North West Province

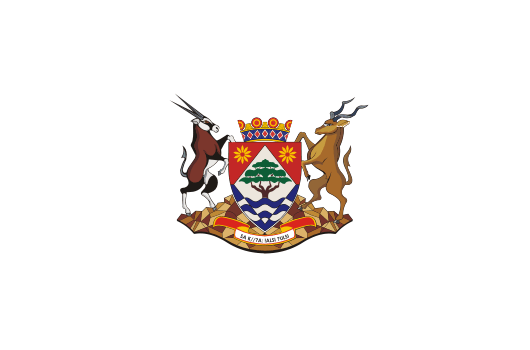
Banner of Northern Cape

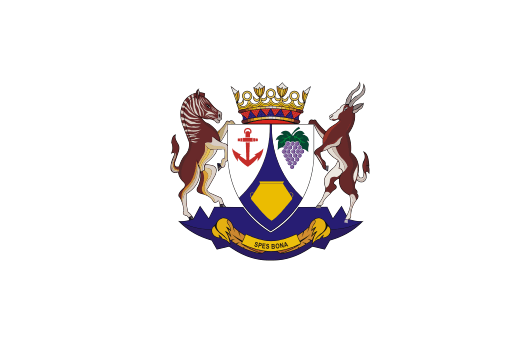
Banner of Western Cape

== House flags ==
Flag of the South African Marine Corporation, 1969–2020

Flag of the Thesen's Steamship Company

== Proposed flags ==
=== Flags proposed in the 1910s ===
1910 proposal (white)

1910 proposal (red)

=== Flags proposed in the 1920s ===
==== Flags from the 1925/1926 Public Flag Competition ====
The government of South Africa opened a competition open to the public. While the "Walker Flag" had some support, ultimately none of the designs were chosen.

Proposal for the flag of South Africa, 1926, four-color version, the "Walker Flag"

Proposal for the flag of South Africa, boxes version

Proposal for the flag of South Africa, orange cross version

Proposal for the flag of South Africa, Southern Cross stripes version

Proposal for the flag of South Africa, Southern Cross circle version

Proposal for the flag of South Africa, bordered version

Proposal for the flag of South Africa, five colors with white stripes version

Proposal for the flag of South Africa, five colors with boxes version

Proposal for the flag of South Africa, six stripes version

Proposal for the flag of South Africa, six stripes Netherlands version

Proposal for the flag of South Africa, checkered version

Proposal for the Flag of South Africa, six stripes with box version

==== Flags from the 1927 Flag Commission ====
In 1927, the government set up a flag commission, which came up with three designs, the "Cross Flags". Due to the opposition insisting on the Union Jack being featured, the commission created three more designs at the Flag Conference in April and May of 1927.

Proposal for the flag of South Africa, 1927, red cross version

Proposal for the flag of South Africa, 1927, white cross version

Proposal for the flag of South Africa, 1927, green version

Committee proposal 1

Committee proposal 2

Committee proposal 3

==== Flags put forward in 1927 by SAP, Government, and Senate ====
In June of 1927, the South African Party proposed a flag with four elements divided by a white cross, and the government proposed a version with a shield defacing the Prinsenvlag. The Senate then combined elements from both into a third proposal. Finally, in October of 1927, a compromise was reached and the Flag of South Africa (1928–1994) was introduced.

Proposal for the flag of South Africa, 1927, four quadrants version proposed by the South African Party

1927 proposal by the government

1927 proposal by the Senate

=== Flags proposed in the 1960s ===
In the 1960s, there was pressure to change the flag, particularly from Afrikaners who resented the fact that the Union Flag was a part of the flag. The then prime minister, Dr Hendrik Verwoerd, had his assistant secretary, HC Blatt, design a "clean" flag, comprising three vertical stripes of orange, white, and blue, with a leaping springbok over a wreath of six proteas in the centre, designed, but he was assassinated before he could introduce it, and the project died with him in 1966.

Proposal for the flag of South Africa, 1965, the "Verwoerd Flag"

=== Flags proposed in the 1990s ===
==== 1992 Contest by the "Natal Witness" ====
The Natal Witness newspaper held a competition for a new flag design, which was won by Lalsingh Ramlukan with a design featuring four cupped hands and a blue dove.

==== Designs shortlisted by the Commission on National Symbols ====
The Commission on National Symbols proposed six designs in October 1993.

Proposal 1

Proposal 2

Proposal 3

Proposal 4

Proposal 5

Proposal 6

==== Designs Proposed Graphic design studios ====
A group of professional graphic design studios proposed several flag designs in November 1993.

==== Designs shortlisted by the Joint Technical Working Committee ====
The Joint Technical Working Committee shortlisted 5 designs in February 1994. A further design was proposed also by the African National Congress (ANC) based on a design shortlisted in October 1993. Proposal 4, designed by State Herald Frederick Brownell, was submitted to the Transitional Executive Council and approved as the final choice for the new flag.

Proposal 1

Proposal 2

Proposal 3

Proposal 4

Proposal 5

Proposal by ANC

== See also ==
- Flag of South Africa
- Flag of South Africa (1928–1994)
- National symbols of South Africa
- Coat of arms of South Africa
- Flag of the South African Republic
- Flag of the Orange Free State
- Flag of the Cape Colony
- Flag of Stellaland
- Flag of the Natalia Republic
