= Flag of Stellaland =

Official flag of the South African Republic Stellaland

Stellaland
- Proportion: 2:3
- Adopted: 1883
- Design: A green background with a white star in the center.
- Designed by: Unknown

The flag of Stellaland was the official flag of the short-lived southern African Republic of Stellaland, which existed from 1883 to 1885.

== History ==
Stellaland arose from a war in Bechuanaland in 1881–82. It was established by a group of mercenaries who had fought in the war. The territory was self-governing from January 1883, and a self-proclaimed 'republic' from August 1883. Independence was short-lived, though, as Stellaland was occupied by British forces in March 1885, and was later incorporated into British Bechuanaland.

== Description ==
First flag (1883)

Although the Republic of Stellaland existed for only eighteen months, its flag history is as complicated as its politics, and some uncertainty exists.

During the period from January to August 1883, i.e. before the proclamation of the republic, the flag is reported to have been a red star on a blue background.

As a republic, Stellaland had two flags :

- a green flag displaying a white star; and
- a green flag ('standard') displaying the Stellaland coat of arms.

There is also a third historical flag – green and red, displaying a white star – which various writers since 1952 have attributed to the republic, but its provenance is unclear and it may very well date from after 1885.

=== Green flag displaying a white star ===
Stellaland flag

This appears to have been the official flag. An official document issued in 1884 depicts the Stellaland coat of arms flanked by flags, including a green flag with a white 5-pointed star. Three of the original Stellalanders later confirmed that this was the Stellaland flag. 'Groot' Adriaan de la Rey, who had been a member of the Bestuur, stated in 1898 that the flag had been "a green cloth with a star on it". Mrs Christina Doms, whose late husband had also been a member of the Bestuur, stated in 1924 that the flag was "a white star stitched onto a green field". Charles Dennison referred in 1928 to "the Stellaland flag of green base and white star", and depicted it on the cover of his book.

G.W. Haws, who lived in Vryburg in the early 1930s and researched the Stellaland flag and coat of arms, reported in 1933 that Dennison had told him that "a green flag with a star on it was the common flag of Stellaland."

Had Stellaland and Goshen gone ahead and formed a united state, a second star was to have been added to the flag.

Some reference books give alternate versions of this flag, e.g. green with a white 6- or 8-pointed star, or green with a yellow star. None of the writers, however, cite any sources for their information.

=== Green flag displaying the Stellaland coat of arms ===
This flag, measuring 1.4 metres (wide) by 2.3 metres, was used by the government. It was known as the 'standard'. According to G.W. Haws, Dennison told him that "the standard with arms was only flown on the 'government' quarters, the site of the flagstaff being next the Landdrost's office, now covered by the cinema (Plaza) at a spot by the main entrance."

On 21 August 1885, after the British occupation, the Bestuur resolved to send the standard to Queen Victoria, "praying that she may be pleased to keep us under her protection". This was duly done, and the standard hung in Windsor Castle until 1934, when King George V returned it to South Africa. It was placed in the Vryburg town hall in 1935.

=== Green and red flag displaying a white star ===
Flag of unknown provenance associated with Stellaland

This flag is divided vertically into green and red, and has a white 8-pointed star in the middle. According to Gerard's Flags Over South Africa (1952), "this flag was returned from England in 1934 to General Smuts and his widow presented it to the Transvaal Museum".

The provenance of the flag is unclear. It is possible that it came from Stellaland as a region, but was not an official flag of the Republic of Stellaland. It may date from after 1885.

== Sources ==
- Bornman, H. (1982). Vryburg 1882–1982.
- Burgers, A.P. (1997). Sovereign Flags over Southern Africa.
- Burgers, A.P. (2008). The South African Flag Book.
- Dennison, C.G. (1928). History of Stellaland.
- Du Toit, A. (1983). Op 'n Storm van Drome.
- Gerard, R. (1952). Flags Over South Africa.
- Goldman, P.L.A. (1927). Beredeneerde Inventarissen van die Oudste Archiefstukken der Zuid-Afrikaansche Republiek.
- Mackenzie, W. (1902). John MacKenzie, South African Missionary and Statesman.
- Pama, C. (1981). Flags of Southern Africa.
- Radburn, A. (2014). 'Captain Haws and the Standard of Stellaland' in South African Vexillological Association Newsletter SN 70/14 (December 2014).
- Radburn, A. (2015). 'Stellaland's Flags : Examining the Evidence' in South African Vexillological Association Newsletter SN 73/15 (December 2015).
- Theal, G.M. (1919). History of South Africa from 1873 to 1884.
- Upington, T. (1885). Bechuanaland – by a Member of the Cape Legislature.
- Van Zyl, J.A. (1943/1995). A History of the Flags of South Africa Before 1900.

== See also ==
- Coat of arms of Stellaland
- List of South African flags
- Flag of the Cape Colony
- Flag of Goshen
- Flag of Natal
- Flag of the Natalia Republic
- Flag of the Nieuwe Republiek
- Flag of the Orange Free State
- Flag of the Orange River Colony
- Flag of South Africa
- Flag of the South African Republic
- Flag of Transvaal
