= Flag of Natal =

Official Flag of the South African Colony of Natal

Second flag : 1875–1910

The flag of Natal was the official flag of the South African colony of Natal from 1870 to 1910. It formed part of a system of colonial flags that were used throughout the British Empire.

== History ==
In a series of decisions made in 1864, 1865, and 1869, the British government decided that every colony should have a distinctive badge, to be displayed on flags at sea. The governor was to display the badge in the centre of the Union Jack when travelling by sea; vessels owned by the colony's government were to display it in the fly of the Blue Ensign; and, with Admiralty permission, privately owned ships registered in the colony could display the badge in the fly of the Red Ensign. This system is still in operation in the remaining British overseas territories.

The Natal government chose its Public Seal as its first flag badge, in 1870. It was replaced in 1905 with a simpler design, which was used until the colony was incorporated into the Union of South Africa on 31 May 1910.

== Description ==
The first flag badge (1870–1905) consisted of the colony's Public Seal, which dated from 1846. This was a complex design, depicting the British royal arms above a landscape scene showing two wildebeest running across a plain, with hills in the background. The flag badge was based on a drawing of the seal made by the colonial engineer, Peter Paterson, in 1870, and a new drawing made by his successor, Captain Albert Hime, in 1875.

The second badge (1905–10) showed on the landscape scene, in an ornamental frame topped with a crown. The name 'Natal' was included in the design.

== Sources ==
- Brownell, F.G. (1993). National and Provincial Symbols.
- Burgers, A.P. (1997). Sovereign Flags over Southern Africa.
- Burgers, A.P. (2008). The South African Flag Book.
- Leverton, B.J. (1962). 'The Origins of the Natal Coat of Arms' in Lantern (September 1962).
- Pama, C. (1965). Lions and Virgins.
- Weekes, N. (2008). Colonial Flag Badges : A Chronology.

== See also ==
- List of South African flags
- Flag of the Cape Colony
- Flag of Goshen
- Flag of the Natalia Republic
- Flag of the Nieuwe Republiek
- Flag of the Orange Free State
- Flag of the Orange River Colony
- Flag of South Africa
- Flag of the South African Republic
- Flag of Stellaland
- Flag of Transvaal
