= Klein Vrystaat =

African country (1886–1891)

Little Free State Klein Vrystaat
- 1886–1891
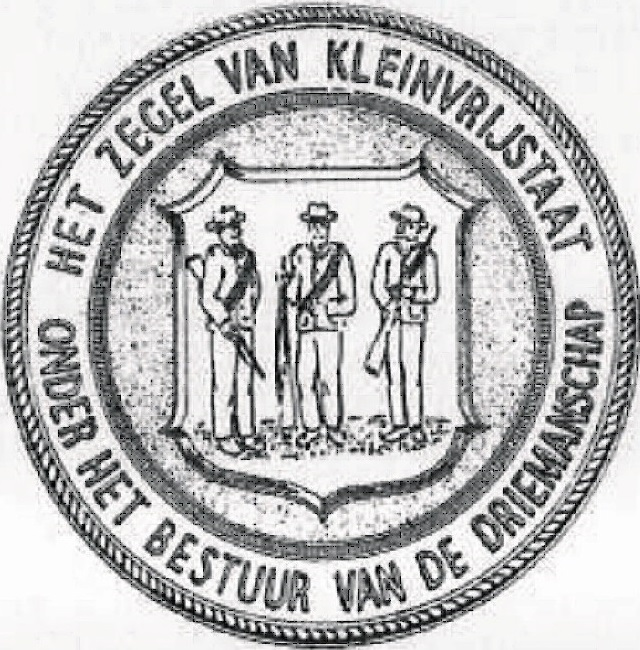
- Flag Coat of arms
- Motto: Dutch: Onder het bestuur van de Driemanschap "Under the rule of the Triumvirate"
- Boer Republics in pink, Klein Vrystaat is the smallest of the Boer Republics
- Status: Boer Republic
- Capital: Vaalkop Farm
- Common languages: Dutch
- Religion: Dutch Reformed; Dutch Reformed dissenters
- Triumvirate
- Legislature: Triumvirate
- History
  - Founding of Klein Vrystaat: 1886
  - Annexed by the South African Republic: 2 August 1891
- Currency: South African pound (£)
Preceded by	Succeeded by
Swazi people	South African Republic

Klein Vrystaat (Afrikaans for 'Little Free State') was a short-lived Boer republic in what is now South Africa (around the town of Piet Retief).

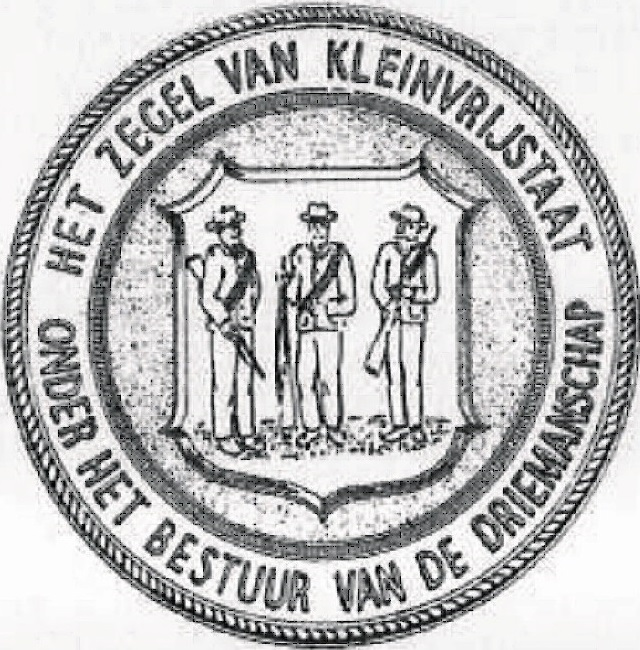
Klein Vrystaat seal depicting the Triumvirate

== History ==
From around 1876, a group of Boers lived on land bought from the Swazi king Mbandzeni. In 1886, a formal government was formed, following the adoption of a constitution.

King Mbandzeni sold the land but kept his kingdom. He was another son of Mswati II, ruling from 1875 to 1889.

This state existed until 1891 when it was incorporated into the South African Republic (Transvaal).

=== Flag and land grants ===
The flag of the Klein Vrystaat (KVS) is almost identical to the Transvaal's own Vierkleur: a horizontal red-white-blue triband with a vertical green stripe near the hoist. The difference between the two lies in that the width of the green stripe was equal to the height of the horizontal stripes in the Klein Vrystaat flag, and a quarter thicker in the Transvaal flag.

The KVS was mainly a European (largely Afrikaner) community located on Swazi-owned land along the kingdom's southwestern border with the Transvaal, which was granted in 1877 by iNgwenyama Mbandzeni Dlamini to two hunters: Joachim Johannes Ferreira and Frans Ignatius Maritz. The land consisted of 36,000 acres (15,000 ha) northeast of the present town of Piet Retief. What Mbandzeni thought he had granted was in the nature of a permanent grazing concession, but Ferreira and Maritz opened up the territory to Afrikaner settlement and subdivided it into small farms. Mbandzeni finally gave them permission to form their own labndla (council), which led to the establishment of a local government, consisting of a president and council, with its own constitution and laws. Johannes Jurgen Bezuidenhoudt (10 November 1830 – 7 March 1911) was appointed the president of the Klein Vrystaat.

=== Miniature republic ===
The Swazi saw the Zulus' refusal to allow white farmers, traders and missionaries to penetrate their land, leading to Britain's defeat of the Zulus in the Anglo-Zulu War of 1879. In the 1880s, King Mbandzeni granted numerous concessions to Boer graziers along with British traders and miners. This amounted to a "paper conquest" of Swaziland. After the Anglo-Zulu War, the Swazis aided the British in dissolving the Pedi Kingdom. In gratitude, Britain promised the Swazis they would retain their independence.

The Nieuwe Republiek Zuid Afrika was created by the Boers on Zulu territory in 1884, and the Klein Vrystaat in Swaziland in 1886 as a miniature republic. In each case, use was made of tribal warfare among the African population to introduce a small amounted of Boer colonisers, who, having defeated one of the contenders in the tribal war, exacted their price, in land, from the victor. In 1886, the discovery of gold made the Transvaal the prime force in southern Africa. The Boers demanded the British agree to their expansion either north across the Limpopo River or east through Swaziland (the road to the sea). Britain reversed its position on Swazi independence and by 1894 had allowed the Boers to establish control over Swaziland.

White settlers arrived in greater numbers throughout the 1880s, after the discovery of gold in neighboring Transvaal and at Piggs Peak and Forbes Reef in Swaziland. Mswati's son, Mbandzeni, granted large chunks of his territory in concessions to the new arrivals, emboldening the Boers to ignore his claims to most of the rest, and, by the time Swaziland became a protectorate of the South African Republic in 1894, there was precious little land left. In 1886, the settlers declared their independence as the Little Free State and were able to rebuff Mbandzeni's halfhearted attempts to evict them on the grounds that they had exceeded his mandate. In 1888, Ferreira and Maritz requested that the South African Republic (ZAR) incorporate them into the Transvaal, claiming that Mbandzeni had renounced his authority over them. At that point, Mbandzeni reasserted his sovereignty over the territory and demanded an annual rental payment of £21, but, by then, it was too late. By the terms of the first Swaziland Convention (1890), the Little Free State KVS was incorporated into the ZAR, with the accord of the British, as part of the Piet Retief, Mpumalanga district.

=== British control ===
After their victory in the Second Anglo-Boer War (1899–1902), Britain assumed control of the territory and retained it until 1968.

== See also ==
- The Orange Free State: the larger Vrystaat during the time of Klein Vrystaat
