= Flag of Mpumalanga =

Flag of a South African province

Mpumalanga
- Proportion: 2:3
- Adopted: 23 February 1996

The provincial flag of Mpumalanga was adopted in 1996, making the province the first and only of South Africa's nine provinces to make use of an official provincial flag. The other provinces currently use the province's coat of arms on a white background (except for Western Cape which uses a banner of arms). The design also features in the province's coat of arms.

== Design ==
The canton of the flag is dominated by a stylised red Barberton daisy, a plant which is indigenous to the province. The diagonal strip of blue and white separating the green and gold bars is meant to represent the escarpment of the province's topology.

== See also ==
- List of South African flags
