= Flag of the Orange Free State =

Historical flag

Orange Free State
- Adopted: 23 February 1857
- Relinquished: 31 May 1902
- Design: Seven alternating white and orange horizontal stripes with the Dutch Flag displayed in the top left.

The flag of the Orange Free State was officially used from 1857 to 1902. It was superseded by the flag of the Orange River Colony.

== History ==
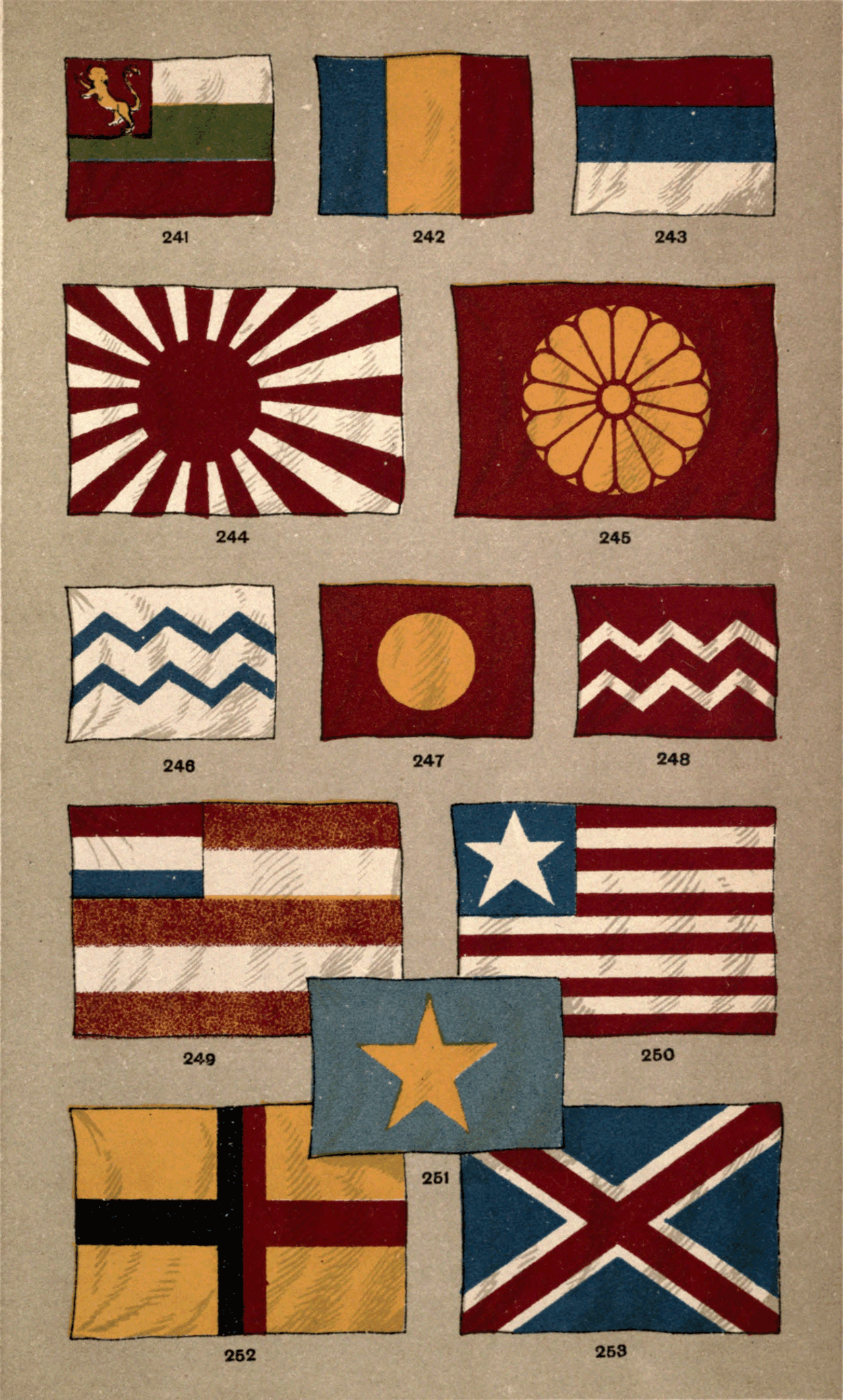
Incorrect version with five stripes shown in The Flags of the World (1896)

When the Orange Free State became an independent republic in February 1854, the government hoisted a red, white and blue flag. Details of the exact design have been lost, but it was presumably similar to the contemporary flag of the Netherlands. It was evidently intended as a temporary flag, as the first State President, Josias Philip Hoffman asked King Willem III of the Netherlands (r. 1849–1890) to give the new state which bore the Dutch royal family's name a flag and coat of arms. The king graciously agreed.

A flag and coat of arms were designed by the Hoge Raad van Adel. They duly arrived in the Orange Free State in January 1856, and the Volksraad (legislature) resolved on 28 February 1856 that "the design of the flag sent by the King of the Netherlands shall be adopted". It was officially taken into use a year later, on 23 February 1857, the third anniversary of the republic.

It was used until the republic came to an end on 31 May 1902.

The flag was later incorporated into the design of the national flag of South Africa (from 1928 to 1994) and used by the Anglo-Boer War Museum and the Voortrekker Monument.

The flag also appears in the music video of the Afrikaans song De la Rey by Bok van Blerk.

== Description ==
The flag consisted of seven horizontal bands of white (4) and orange (3), with the Dutch flag in the canton.

== See also ==
- Coat of arms of the Orange Free State
- List of South African flags
- Flag of the Cape Colony
- Flag of Goshen
- Flag of Natal
- Flag of the Natalia Republic
- Flag of the Orange River Colony
- Flag of South Africa
- Flag of the South African Republic
- Flag of Stellaland
- Flag of Transvaal

== Sources ==
- Brownell, F.G. (1993). National and Provincial Symbols.
- Burgers, A.P. (1997). Sovereign Flags over Southern Africa.
- Burgers, A.P. (2008). The South African Flag Book.
- Pama, C. (1965). Lions and Virgins.
