= Lippulaulu =

Patriotic song about the Finnish flag

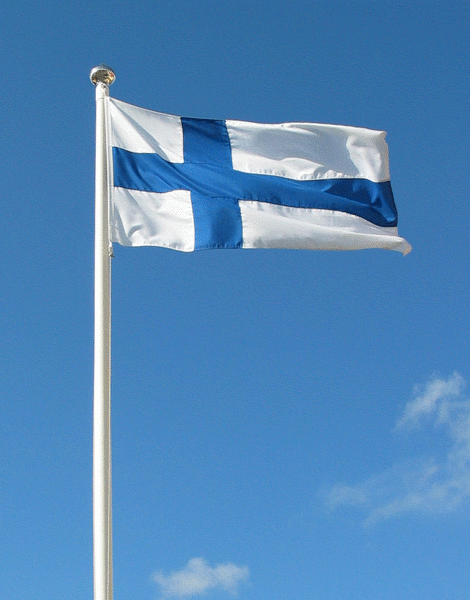
An example of where and when the Lippulaulu would be sung.

Lippulaulu (transl. Flag song) also known Siniristilippumme is a flag anthem, written by Veikko Antero Koskenniemi and composed by Yrjö Kilpinen in 1927. The song is often sung during flag raisings on flag flying days in Finland, especially on Midsummer and Independence Day.

Koskenniemi wrote the song following the flag change to the Blue cross flag in May 1918. In 1917, Koskenniemi had written a poem about the previous Lion flag, which was used during the Finnish Civil War, his poem was named Leijonalippu (transl. Lion Flag).

The text of the song is deeply patriotic and even warlike, calling for the sacrifice of one's life for their country.

== Text ==
Finnish lyrics

Siniristilippumme,
sulle käsin vannomme, sydämin:
sinun puolestas elää ja kuolla
on halumme korkehin.

Kuin taivas ja hanki Suomen
ovat värisi puhtahat.
Sinä hulmullas mielemme nostat
ja kotimme korotat.

Isät, veljet verellään
vihki sinut viiriksi vapaan maan.
Ilomiellä sun jäljessäs käymme
teit' isäin astumaan.

Sun on kunnias kunniamme,
sinun voimasi voimamme on.
Sinun kanssasi onnemme jaamme
ja iskut kohtalon.

Siniristilippumme,
sulle valan vannomme kallihin:
sinun puolestas elää ja kuolla
on halumme korkehin.

English version

Our blue cross flag,
we swear to you with our hands, with our hearts:
To live and die for you
is our greatest wish.

Like the sky and snow of Finland
are your pure colours.
With your fluttering you lift up our thoughts
and ennoble our homes.

With their blood our fathers and brothers
consecrated you as the flag of a free land.
Joyfully we follow you
in our fathers' footsteps.

Your honour is our honour,
your might is our might.
With you we share our fortunes
and the blows of fate.

Our blue cross flag,
to you we swear dearly:
To live and die for you
Is our greatest wish.

== See also ==
- Maamme
- National anthem
