= Nomfunelo Mabedla =

South African politician

Nomfunelo Rose-Mary Mabedla is a South African politician representing the African National Congress (ANC) and a trade unionist. She is a former Member of Parliament of the National Assembly between 2009 and 2014.

== Early career ==
Mabedla started her political career as an ANC election agent in 1994. After that she became a shop steward for the National Education, Health and Allied Workers' Union from 1996 to 2003 before becoming a local secretary for the Congress of South African Trade Unions. After this in 2005, she became the ANC's deputy chairperson for the Joe Gqabi District Municipality branch as well as becoming their treasurer.

== Member of Parliament ==
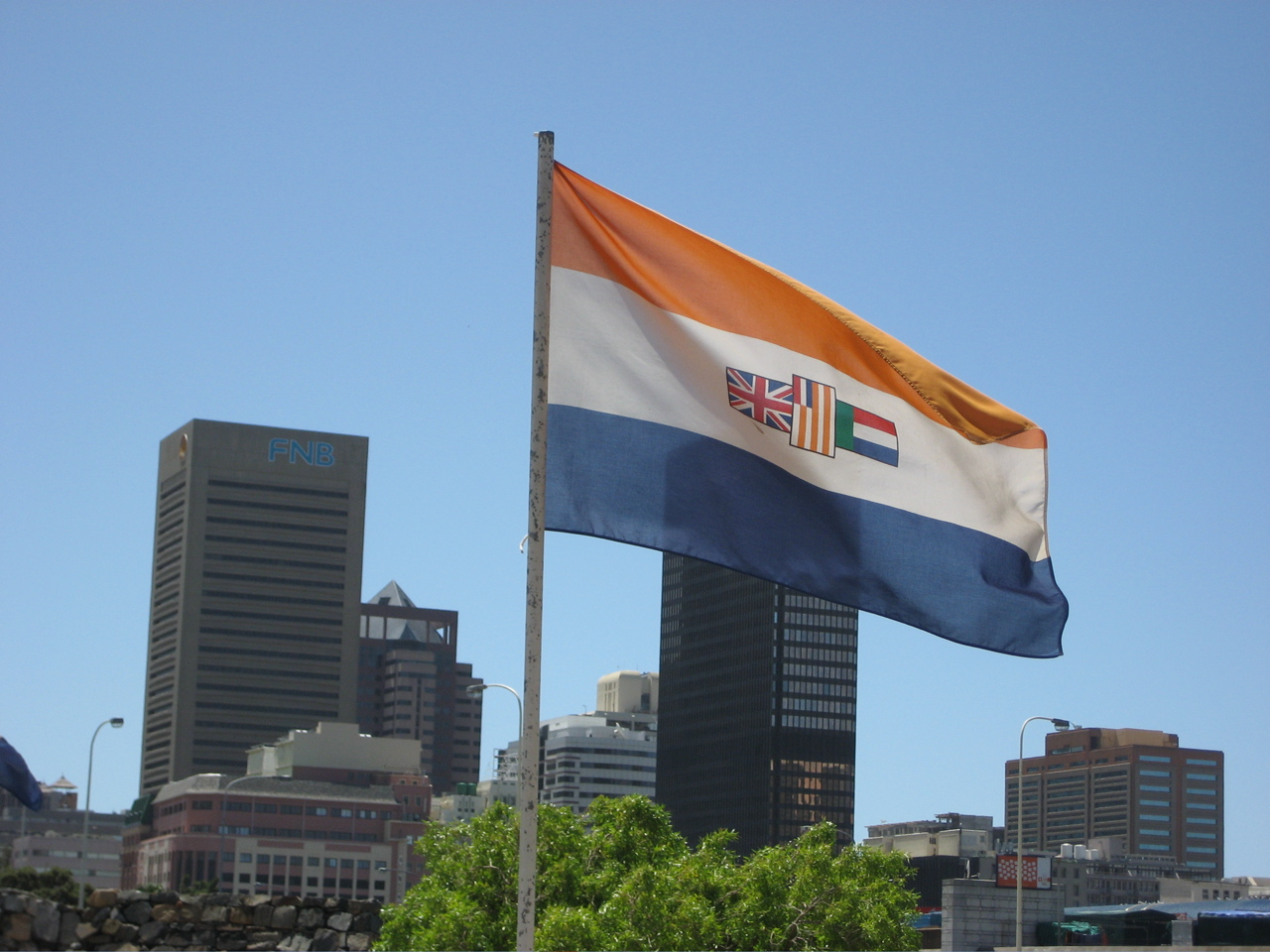
The flag at the castle that Mabedla successfully campaigned to be removed

Mabedla was elected as a Member of Parliament at the 2009 South African general election in the Pixley ka Seme constituency in Northern Cape. During her time in Parliament she was appointed a member of the Defence committee. In 2012, she led a campaign to remove the former flag of South Africa from the parapet of the Castle of Good Hope in Cape Town. Previously the old flag had flown alongside the current flag of South Africa with the flag of the United Kingdom, the Prince's Flag and the flag of the Netherlands, in historical reference to the powers that had ruled South Africa. Mabedla said that the flags flying upset her because she felt that they represented the racist domination of non-white South Africans and that they should be in a museum. In response, it was agreed that all flags except the current flag of South Africa were to be removed from the parapet and placed into the castle's museum.

In 2014, she stood for re-election on the ANC's national list at number 160. However, she lost her seat in Parliament at the 2014 South African general election to the Democratic Alliance.
