= Vlaglied =

1961–1994 South African de facto flag anthem

- Former flag anthem of South Africa
- Also known as: "Ons eie vlag"
- Lyrics: Cornelis Jacobus Langenhoven
- Music: F.J. Joubert
- Adopted: 1961
- Relinquished: 1994

"Vlaglied" is a South African patriotic song from the 20th century. It is an ode dedicated to the former South African flag that was used from 1928 to 1994. The song was notably used during the apartheid era as a de facto flag anthem.

== History ==
The lyrics were written by C.J. Langenhoven, who also wrote the lyrics to the former South African national anthem, "Die Stem van Suid-Afrika." It is set to music by F.J. Joubert; it is a military-style march.

As late as the 1980s, "Vlaglied" was encouraged to be sung at white schools by the apartheid regime of South Africa, in order to help bolster the country's system of apartheid. After apartheid ended in the early 1990s, the song fell out of use by many alongside the flag.
