= Flag of the Cape Colony =

Former colonial flag of Cape Colony

Cape Colony
- Use: Civil and state flag, state ensign
- Proportion: 1:2
- Adopted: 1876

The flag of Cape Colony was the official flag of the Cape Colony from 1876 to 1910. It formed part of a system of colonial flags that was used throughout the British Empire.

== History ==
In a series of decisions made in 1864, 1865, and 1869, the UK's government decided that every colony should have a distinctive badge, to be displayed on flags at sea. The governor was to display the badge in the center of the Union Jack when travelling by sea; vessels owned by the colony's government were to display it in the fly of the Blue Ensign; and, with Admiralty permission, privately owned ships registered in the colony could display the badge in the fly of the Red Ensign. This system is still in operation in the remaining British overseas territories.

The Cape government was initially not in favor of the system but eventually complied with British government requests to adopt a flag badge. The Molteno ministry decided to introduce a coat of arms, which would also serve as the flag badge. The coat of arms was first displayed on a flag at the laying of the foundation stone of the Houses of Parliament on 12 May 1875. It was formally granted by Queen Victoria on 29 May 1876, and made its official appearance as a flag badge shortly afterwards. It was used until the colony was incorporated into the Union of South Africa on 31 May 1910.

== Description ==
The flag badge consisted of the Cape Colony coat of arms on a white disc. The coat of arms consisted of a red shield displaying a golden lion between three golden rings, below a silver horizontal strip ('chief') containing three golden fleurs de lis on blue discs. The figure of Hope formed the crest, and the shield was supported by a wildebeest and a gemsbok. The motto 'Spes Bona' ('Good Hope') was displayed below the shield.

== Sources ==
- Brownell, F.G. (1993). National and Provincial Symbols.
- Burgers, A.P. (1997). Sovereign Flags over Southern Africa.
- Burgers, A.P. (2008). The South African Flag Book.
- Pama, C. (1965). Lions and Virgins.
- Weekes, N. (2008). Colonial Flag Badges : A Chronology.

== See also ==
- Coat of arms of Cape Colony
- List of South African flags
- Flag of Goshen
- Flag of Natal
- Flag of the Natalia Republic
- Flag of the Nieuwe Republiek
- Flag of the Orange Free State
- Flag of the Orange River Colony
- Flag of South Africa
- Flag of Stellaland
- Flag of Transvaal
