= Flag of the Natalia Republic =

Flag of the Natalia Republic

The flag of the Natalia Republic was the official flag of this short-lived South African state, which existed from 1839 to 1843.

== History ==
Emigrant Boers ('voortrekkers') from the Cape Colony established an independent state in 1839, on territory conquered from the Zulus. They named it 'Natalia'. It is uncertain what flag – if any – they flew at first, but on 24 December 1839 they raised a new flag at Port Natal (now Durban. The same flag was raised in the capital, Pietermaritzburg, in January 1840.

British forces invaded the republic in May 1842 and occupied Pietermaritzburg two months later. The flag was probably discontinued at that time or shortly afterwards. After three years of military occupation, the United Kingdom formally annexed Natalia, as 'Natal', in May 1844.

Andries Pretorius, former Prime Minister of the Natalia Republic, and his followers, arrived in Potchefstroom after the annexation of Natal to the United Kingdom and brought with him the flag which saw continued use in Potchefstroom until it was relinquished in 1858.

== Description ==
The flag and its design passed into obscurity. They returned to public notice only after the South African Archives acquired the papers of Professor Ulrich Lauts in 1925. Back in 1847, Lauts had published a book (in the Netherlands) in which he described the flag as being in the colours of the Dutch flag (i.e. red, white and blue) and in the same order. "The white, however, stretches from a point in the middle of the hoist to the full width of the cloth at the end of the flag".

An article in a popular magazine in 1928 brought this description of the flag to the public's attention. Illustrations based on it have been published in many articles and books since then.

The Voortrekkers youth organisation, founded in 1931, adopted the Natalia flag as its own.

The Voortrekker Monument used the Natalia flag in its Cenotaph Hall.

The flag is generally made and depicted as rectangular, in the proportions 2:3. However, a contemporary painting of the flag, on a document dated 1842, which was found in the Algemene Rijksarchief in the Netherlands in 1953, shows a square flag.

== Sources ==
- Brownell, F.G. (1993). National and Provincial Symbols.
- Burgers, A.P. (1997). Sovereign Flags over Southern Africa.
- Burgers, A.P. (2008). The South African Flag Book.
- Pama, C. (1965). Lions and Virgins.

== See also ==
- Coat of arms of Natal
- List of South African flags
- Flag of the Cape Colony
- Flag of Goshen
- Flag of Natal
- Flag of the Nieuwe Republiek
- Flag of the Orange River Colony
- Flag of South Africa
- Flag of the South African Republic
- Flag of Stellaland
- Flag of Transvaal
