= Flag of the South African Republic =

Flag of the SAR

'Vierkleur' (1857–74, 1875–77, 1881–1902, and 1914–1915)

'Burgers Flag' (1874–75)

The South African Republic, which existed from 1852 to 1877, 1881 to 1902, and 1914 to 1915, used two flags: (1) the so-called 'Vierkleur' (English: Four-colour) from 1857 to 1874, and again from 1875 to 1877 and 1881 to 1902, and (2) the so-called 'Burgers Flag' from 1874 to 1875. They were superseded by the flag of Transvaal. The Vierkleur was also used by the South African Republic declared in 1914 during the Maritz Rebellion, which lasted into February 1915.

== History ==
In 1856, the Voortrekker territories north of the Vaal River agreed to unite as the "South African Republic". A constitution was drawn up and a flag designed. The flag, known as the Vierkleur (English: "Four colour") was raised in Potchefstroom on 6 January 1857, and was ratified by the Volksraad of the South African Republic (legislature) on 18 February 1858. The Vierkleur was flown until October 1874.

The new flag, introduced by state president Thomas François Burgers, was approved by the Volksraad on 24 October 1874. It was an improved version of a flag which some of the Voortrekkers are believed to have used in the 1830s and '40s. However, it was very unpopular, and on 10 May 1875, the Volksraad restored the Vierkleur as the official flag.

The 'Vierkleur' was in abeyance during the British occupation of the Transvaal, from 12 April 1877 to 7 August 1881. It flew again until the republic came to a final end on 31 May 1902. It was later used by the Maritz Revolt rebels who declared a resurrection of the South African Republic in 1914 and later incorporated into the national flag of South Africa from 1928 to 1994.

After the adoption of the 1928 flag, the Vierkleur has been used by far-right groups opposed to societal reform and racial integration, such as the Afrikaner Weerstandsbeweging.

The Anglo-Boer War Museum in Bloemfontein flies the Vierkleur (together with the flag of the Orange Free State and that of the present Republic of South Africa). The Vierkleur and the Burgers Flag figure among other flags of Boer republics on display in the Cenotaph Hall of the Voortrekker Monument near Pretoria.

Potchefstroom adopted the Burgers Flag as city flag.

== Descriptions and Symbolism ==
=== 'Vierkleur' ===
The flag was simply the flag of the Netherlands with the addition of a green vertical band at the hoist. The Volksraad resolution of 18 February 1858 which confirmed the design stated that the motto 'Eendracht maakt macht' (cf. coat of arms of the Transvaal) should be placed on the flag, but this was never done.

The symbolism of the flag, according to Ds. Dirk van der Hoff (one of the designers), can be briefly summarized as follows:

The flag symbolises freedom, glory and divinity. The red colour represents freedom; the white colour represents purity and cleanliness; the blue colour shows the faith which the Republic placed in God; and the green colour represents hope.

Vierkleur
Scheme	Bright Vermillion	White	Cobalt Blue	Green
RGB	(174,28,40)	(255,255,255)	(33,70,139)	(0,122,77)
Hexadecimal	#AE1C28	#FFFFFF	#21468B	#007A4D

=== 'Burgers Flag' ===
The flag is blue, charged with a red saltire fimbriated in white.

Burgers Flag
Scheme	Blue	White	Red
RGB	(0,35,149)	(255,255,255)	(222,56,49)
Hex	#002395	#FFFFFF	#DE3831

== See also ==
- Coat of arms of the Transvaal
- List of South African flags
- Flag of the Cape Colony
- Flag of Goshen
- Flag of Natal
- Flag of the Natalia Republic
- Flag of the Nieuwe Republiek
- Flag of the Orange Free State
- Flag of the Orange River Colony
- Flag of South Africa (1928–1994)
- Flag of Stellaland
- Flag of Transvaal

== Bibliography ==
- Brownell, F.G. (1993). National and Provincial Symbols.
- Burgers, A.P. (1997). Sovereign Flags over Southern Africa.
- Burgers, A.P. (2008). The South African Flag Book.
- Pama, C. (1965). Lions and Virgins.
