= South African Red Ensign =

1910–1928 unofficial flag of the Union of South Africa

Union of South Africa
- South African Red Ensign
- Use: Civil ensign (Note: The South African Red Ensign was also viewed as an unofficial flag of South Africa from 1910 to 1928. However, the ensign was never formally adopted as a national flag.)
- Proportion: 1:2
- Adopted: 1910
- Relinquished: 1951
- Design: A Red Ensign with the coat of arms of South Africa on a white disc
- South African Blue Ensign
- Use: State ensign and naval jack
- Proportion: 1:2
- Adopted: 1910
- Relinquished: 1928
- Design: A Blue Ensign with the coat of arms of South Africa
- Flag of the governor-general of South Africa
- Proportion: 1:2
- Adopted: 1910
- Relinquished: 1931
- Design: A Union Flag with the coat of arms of South Africa on a white disc in the center

The South African Red Ensign was the civil ensign of Union of South Africa from 1910 to 1951. From 1910 to 1928, the flag was also viewed as the unofficial flag of South Africa. The design of the flag was a red ensign defaced with the coat of arms of South Africa on a white disc.

== History ==
The South Africa Red Ensign until 1912

A variant of South Africa Red Ensign with the full coat of arms of South Africa on a white disc.

When the Union of South Africa was created in 1910, the only flag that had official status within it was the Union Jack as part of the British Empire. A new coat of arms was created in September of that year, with Admiralty warrants being issued in December authorising usage of the arms on a red ensign. Though they were intended for maritime usage, the South Africa Red Ensign was used on the land as a de facto national flag similar with other colonies and dominions within the British Empire. In 1912, a royal warrant was issued amending the South Africa Red Ensign so that the arms were on a white disc to bring it into line with a rule in the Admiralty Flag Book requiring the arms to be on a white disc if any part of them were the same colour as the field of the ensign. In 1915, Louis Botha raised the South Africa Red Ensign over Windhoek after the British Empire's conquest of German South-West Africa as part of the South-West Africa campaign.

=== Replacement as an unofficial national flag ===
The 1928 national flag replacement

Despite the South Africa Red Ensign being the de facto flag, it was not popular with either British or Afrikaner communities. Afrikaners, because it contained the Union Jack, and British settlers, because it was not the Union Jack alone.

In 1925, following the 1924 general election in which J. B. M. Hertzog was elected as the first National Party Prime Minister of South Africa, a bill was introduced to the Parliament of South Africa by D. F. Malan for a new flag of South Africa which Malan had hoped for, a "clean flag" without the Union Jack. Discussions to change the flag resulted in three years of volatile negotiations as Afrikaner descendants of Boers who fought in the Boer War found the Union Jack in the flag unacceptable, while British settlers felt that the Afrikaner voting majority was attempting to remove British imperial symbols, and Natal Province threatened to secede if the Union Jack was removed. A compromise was reached after three years whereby the new flag would feature the Union Jack in a reduced position and not as an ensign. The Union Nationality and Flags Act 1928 also provided that the new flag of the Union of South Africa and the Union Jack would be flown together as joint official flags of South Africa.

The South Africa Red Ensign ceased being used as the unofficial national flag but was retained in maritime usage as the merchant ensign until 1951.
