= Flag anthem =

Patriotic song or ode dedicated to a flag

A flag anthem is a patriotic song or ode dedicated to a flag, usually one of a country (in which case it is also known as a national flag anthem). It is often either sung or performed during or immediately before the raising or lowering of a flag during a ceremony. Most countries use their respective national anthems or some other patriotic song for this purpose. However, some countries, particularly in South America, use a distinct flag anthem for such purposes. Not all countries have flag anthems. Some used them in the past but no longer do, such as Iran and South Africa. Flag anthems can be officially codified in law, or unofficially recognized as such through mere custom and convention. In some countries, the flag anthem may be just another song, and in others, it may be an official symbol of the state akin to a second national anthem, such as in the Republic of China.

== List of flag anthems ==
Country	Song	Year	Writer	Composer	Notes
Bolivia	"El Himno a la Bandera"	1947	Ricardo Mujía	Manuel Benavente	
Brazil	"Hino à Bandeira Nacional"	1906	Olavo Bilac	Francisco Braga	
Costa Rica	"Saludo a la Bandera"	1946	Porfirio Brenes Castro	José Joaquín Vargas Calvo	
Denmark	"Fanemarch"				
Dominican Republic	"El Himno a la Bandera"		Ramon Emilio Jimenez		
Ecuador	"El Himno a la Bandera"	1936	Ángel Rivadeneira Pérez		
Estonia	"Eesti lipp"	1922 (music), 1897 (lyrics)	Martin Lipp	Enn Võrk	
Finland	"Lippulaulu"	1927	V.A. Koskenniemi	Yrjö Kilpinen	Title literally means "Flag song" in English; song is also known as "Siniristilippumme".
Indonesia	"Berkibarlah Benderaku"	1950	Ibu Soed		
Italy	"Onori e Inno Nazionale"	1847	No lyrics	Michele Novaro	Essentially an abridged version of the Italian national anthem played with ruffles and flourishes beforehand and omitting the introductory section. The song concludes where the bridge of the national anthem would otherwise begin. Alternatively known as "Alzabandiera".
Japan	"Hinomaru no hata"	1911	Takano Tatsuyuki	Teiichi Okano	
Malaysia	"Jalur Gemilang"	1997	Siso Kopratasa	Pak Ngah	
Netherlands	"Het Vlaggelied"	1863 (lyrics), 1853 (music)	Jan Pieter Heije	Wilhelmus Smits	
North Korea	"Our National Flag"	2019	Lee Hui-jeong	Kim Kang-nam	
Norway	"Flaggappell"	ext. 2002			
Paraguay	"Himno a la Bandera"	1944	Mauricio Cardozo Ocampo		
Switzerland	"Fahnenmarsch"				
Taiwan	"National Flag Anthem of the Republic of China "	1936 (music), 1937 (lyrics)	disputed	Huang Tzu	The author of the lyrics is disputed, though it is usually attributed to Tai Chi-tao. An alternate title is "青天白日滿地紅", which means "The clear blue sky, white sun, and a wholly red ground". Due to political complications, this song is often played at international sporting events involving the country in place of the Taiwanese national anthem.
United States	"You're a Grand Old Flag"	1906	George M. Cohan		Played by the USMC before flag raising ceremonies.
Uruguay	"Mi Bandera"	1939	Nicolás Bonomi	José Usera	

=== Former flag anthems ===
Country	Song	Used	Writer	Composer	Notes
Iran	"Sorude Parcam"	Until 1979	Mohamad Haschim Afsar	Davood Najmi Moghaddam	Title literally means "Flag song" in English; tune also used in the Iranian royal anthem and national anthem of the time.
South Africa	"Vlaglied"	1961–1994	Cornelis Jacobus Langenhoven	F.J. Joubert	Title literally means "Flag song" in English; also known alternatively as "Ons eie vlag".
