= Coat of arms of South Africa (1910–2000) =

Coat of arms from 1910 to 2000

Versions
- The originally granted arms
- Armiger: Monarch of the Union of South Africa (1910–1961); Republic of South Africa (1961–2000)
- Adopted: 1910
- Relinquished: 2000
- Crest: On a wreath of the colours, a lion passant guardant Gules, supporting with the dexter paw four staves erect, alternately Argent and Azure and banded Or.
- Shield: Quarterly per fess wavy: I, Gules, a female figure representing Hope, resting the dexter arm upon a rock, and supporting with the sinister hand an anchor Argent; II, Or, two black wildebeest in full course at random, both proper; III, Or, upon an island an orange tree Vert fructed proper; IV, Vert, a trek wagon Argent.
- Supporters: Dexter a springbok and sinister an oryx (gemsbok), both proper.
- Compartment: Below the shield, on a compartment grassed Vert, two Proteas each with two flower heads proper.
- Motto: Ex Unitate Vires

The first coat of arms of South Africa was granted to the Union of South Africa by King George V and later amended by the British College of Arms. It contained representation of the four provinces within the Union. The coat of arms was later retained by the Republic of South Africa after independence and for a period after the end of apartheid, until being retired in 2000. The 1910 coat of arms was replaced in 2000 by the current coat of arms of South Africa.

== Description ==
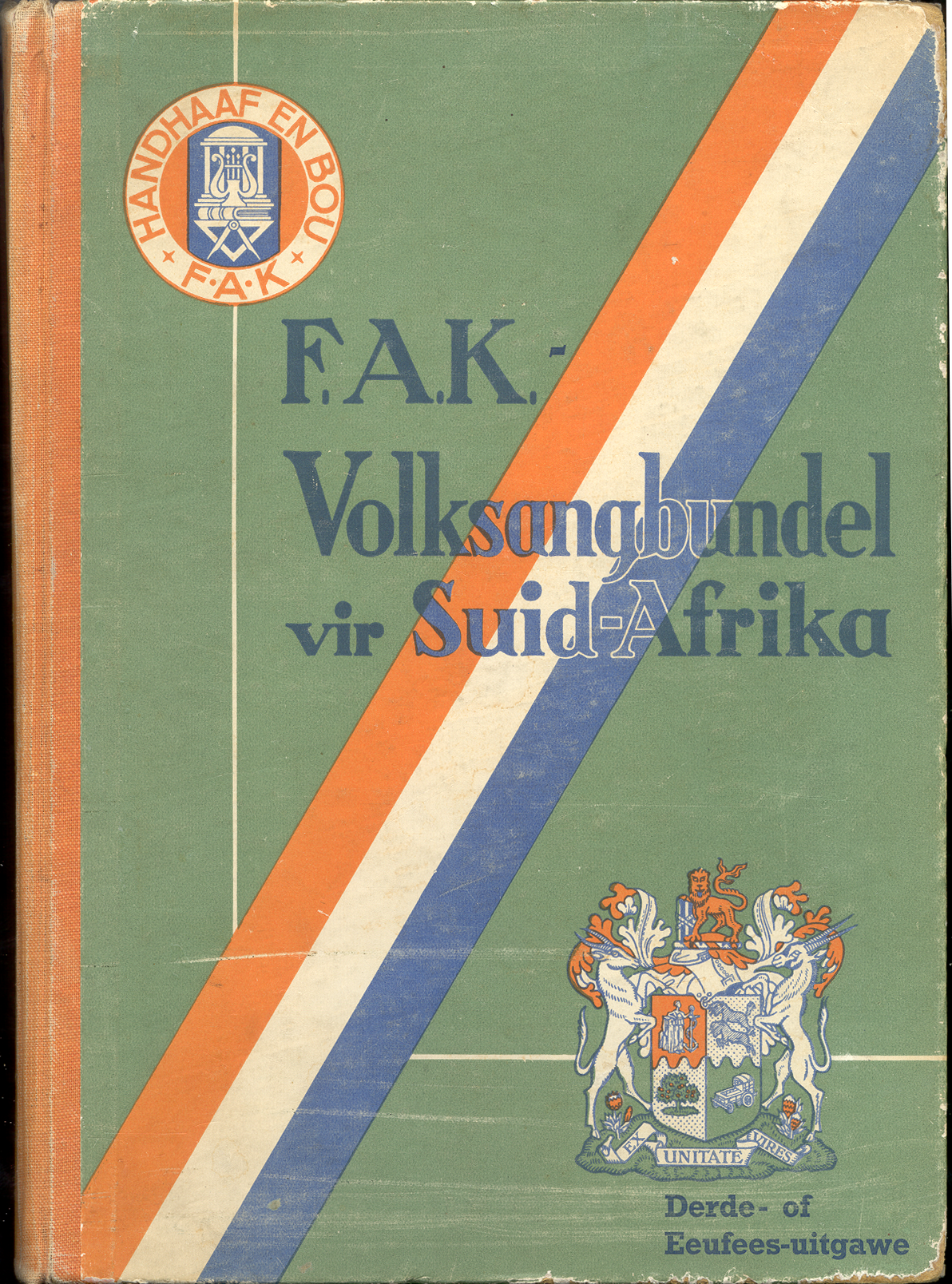
The arms on a book cover from the 1940s

The coat of arms featured a shield quartered. In each quarter was a symbol of the four provinces of South Africa. An ox wagon representing Transvaal Province, a woman with an anchor representing Cape Province, two wildebeests representing Natal Province and an orange tree representing the Orange Free State Province. The crest of the arms featured a lion holding four bound sticks. The supporters were a springbok and a gemsbok. Below the arms was the Latin motto, Ex Unitate Vires (translated as "Union Is Strength" but from 1961, translated as "Unity Is Strength").

The blazon (formal description of the arms in heraldic terms) is: "Quarterly per fesse wavy First Quarter Gules a female figure representing Hope resting the dexter arm upon a rock and supporting with the sinister hand an Anchor Argent Second Quarter Or two Wildebeesten in full course at random both proper Third Quarter Or upon an island an Orange tree Vert fructed proper Fourth Quarter Vert a Trek Waggon Argent And for the Crest On a Wreath of the Colours A Lion passant guardant Gules supporting with the dexter paw four staves erect alternately Argent and Azure and branded Or And for the Supporters, On the dexter side A Spring Buck and on the sinister side An Oryx (Gemsbuck) both proper together with the motto EX UNITATE VIRES."

== History ==
The arms on the South African Red Ensign

1930 to 1932 version; continued to be used for decades afterward in some limited respects such as on police and military insignia.

When Cape Colony, Transvaal Colony, Natal Colony, and the Orange River Colony joined together as the Union of South Africa, it was determined that as a dominion within the British Empire, South Africa should have its own symbol. In 1910, King George V issued a royal warrant for a coat of arms for the Union of South Africa. The arms were then used to create the South Africa Red Ensign used unofficially as the national flag of South Africa until 1928, when the Oranje, Blanje, Blou was adopted. However, the South Africa Red Ensign continued to be used at sea as the merchant ensign until 1951. In 1930, the London-based artist Kruger Gray designed an embellished version of the arms, which was officially adopted by the College of Arms in 1932. In 1961, following the declaration of the Republic of South Africa, the Republic of South Africa Constitution Act made no reference to changing the coat of arms, and therefore the 1910 grant was retained.

The 1910 version used until 1930 continued to be used in some rank insignia of the South African Defence Force and its successor organisation the South African National Defence Force until 2002. The 1930 version was used on the insignia of the South African Police until the 1990s.

During the apartheid era, a facsimile of the coat of arms was featured prominently on the back of the R20 denomination of the South African rand.

=== Replacement ===
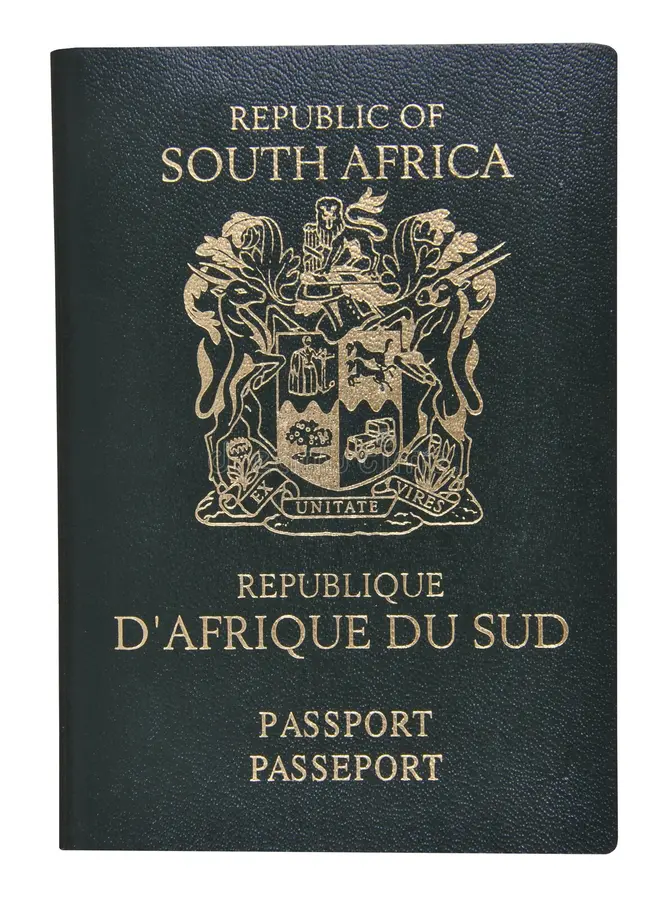
The arms on a South African passport between 1994 and 2007

Following the end of apartheid in the early 1990s, the new Constitution of South Africa stated that the state coat of arms would remain the same despite the flag and national anthem changing. Nevertheless the arms were still viewed as outdated as they had been created by the white British and Afrikaner minorities without input from the black majority. In 1999, the Department of Arts and Culture held a contest to design a new coat of arms. In 2000, the coat of arms was replaced on Freedom Day. Despite the replacement, the old coat of arms was still used for some official purposes after 2000, such as on some military rank insignia until 2002 and on South African passports (which were still issued with the old coat of arms on the cover) until 2007. This was attributed to the government's desire to use up old stocks of passports before issuing ones with the new design.
