= Flag of South Africa (1928–1994) =

South Africa
- "Oranje, Blanje, Blou" "Union flag" "Apartheid flag"
- Use: National flag, civil and state ensign
- Proportion: 2:3
- Adopted: 31 May 1928 (dark version); 1982 (bright version)
- Relinquished: 21 March 1990 (South West Africa); 20 April 1994 (South Africa)
- Design: Three horizontal bands of orange, white and blue with three small flags (the Union Jack to the left, the vertical version of the flag of the Orange Free State in the centre and the flag of the South African Republic to the right) centred on the white band.
- Adopted: 1928
- Relinquished: 1982 (South West Africa); 1982 (South Africa)
- Design: Dark colours

The South African "Red Ensign" was used unofficially as a de facto national flag until 1928; it continued being used sparsely in limited contexts until the early 1950s.

The flag of South Africa from 1928 to 1994 was the flag of the Union of South Africa from 1928 to 1961 and later the flag of the Republic of South Africa until 1994. It was also the flag for South West Africa (now Namibia) under the former's administration (from 1915 to 1990). Based on the Dutch Prince's Flag, it contained the flag of the United Kingdom, the flag of the Orange Free State, and the flag of the South African Republic (respectively) in the centre. A nickname for the flag was Oranje, Blanje, Blou (Afrikaans slang for: "orange, white, blue").

It was adopted in 1928 by an act of Parliament from the first Afrikaner majority government, as a compromise between the Afrikaner and British populations. In 1948, after their election victory, the National Party unsuccessfully tried to amend the flag design. After South Africa became a republic in 1961, the flag was retained as the national flag, despite the country having left the Commonwealth. In 1968, Prime Minister John Vorster proposed that a new national flag for South Africa be adopted in 1971 to commemorate the 10th anniversary of the declaration of a republic. However, Vorster's idea did not gain parliamentary support and the flag change never happened. As a result, it was the national flag during apartheid (1948–1994), and it is also known as the "Apartheid flag". It was replaced by the current flag of South Africa in 1994 with the commencement of the country's transitional constitution and the end of apartheid.

Following its retirement in 1994, the flag has been controversial within South Africa, with some viewing it as historic and a symbol of Afrikaner heritage, while others view it as a symbol of apartheid and white supremacy. In 2023, the Supreme Court of Appeal upheld that "gratuitous" displays of the flag constituted hate speech; exceptions exist for "cases of journalistic, academic and artistic expression" and for museums and places of historical interest.

== Adoption ==
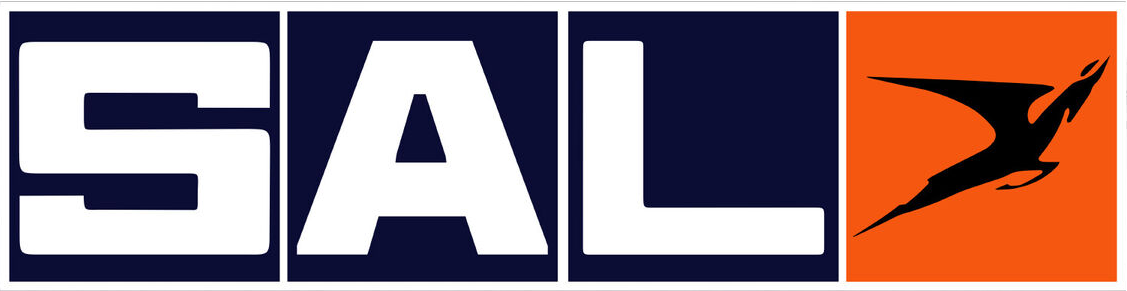
The Afrikaans logo of the South African Airways from 1971 to 1997, which utilised the colours of the flag.

Before 31 May 1928 the only flag that had official status in the Union of South Africa was the United Kingdom's Union Jack as South Africa was part of the British Empire. The South African Red Ensign was used as an unofficial flag. In 1925, discussion rose about creating a new flag for South Africa as many descendants of Boers found the Union Jack unacceptable after the Second Boer War. In 1926 the Balfour Declaration granted South Africa legislative autonomy, opening the possibility of a new flag. British South Africans wanted the Union Jack in the new flag as part of the British Empire while the Afrikaners did not. The majority British Natal Province threatened to secede from the Union if the Union Jack was removed. A compromise was reached whereby the new flag would consist of the Prinsenvlag as this was the first flag raised on South Africa and a badge in the centre consisting of the Union Jack with the flags of the Orange Free State and the South African Republic. The Union Jack was mirrored in the new flag with the hoist on the right so that it did not take precedence over the others. This was denounced by D. F. Malan, then the South African Minister of Home Affairs, who described the group of miniature flags "a scab... which will one day fall off". The South African Red Ensign would be retained as South Africa's merchant ensign until 1951.

In 1927, the Afrikaner-majority Parliament of South Africa passed the Union Nationality and Flag Act, which stated that the Union Jack and the new flag of the Union of South Africa were to have equal status as the flag of South Africa. The act came into force in 1928 when both flags were raised over the Houses of Parliament, Cape Town and the Union Buildings in Pretoria. This dual status was ended in 1957 with the passing of the Flags Amendment Act which declared that the Oranje, Blanje, Blou would be the sole flag of South Africa, with the act also declaring that "Die Stem van Suid-Afrika" would be the country's sole anthem and dropping "God Save the Queen".

When South Africa became a republic outside the Commonwealth on 31 May 1961, the flag remained the same. The Afrikaner voting majority disliked the flag retaining the Union Jack in the centre. Repeated calls were made for it to be removed or for a new flag but no action was taken by the ruling National Party until 1968. Prime Minister B. J. Vorster convened a commission in that year to create a new flag in time for the tenth anniversary of the establishment of the republic in 1971, but no changes were eventually made.

The flag was treated with respect by Afrikaners, with daily flag salutes in schools. It was also used as part of celebrations of the inauguration of the State President. The flag even had an ode dedicated to it, "Vlaglied" (English: "Flag Song"), written by Cornelis Jacobus Langenhoven and composed by F.J. Joubert.

Due to variances in manufacturing, many flags were manufactured with their blue a dark shade akin to that found on the flag of the UK, as many early flags were made in the UK. Because of this discrepancy, in 1982, the South African government specified that "Solway blue", a lighter shade of blue, be used on the flags as was originally intended.

The flag was featured on the cantons of the flags of government agencies such the military, prisons service, and police. After the flag was retired in 1994, the new South African flag replaced it on those flags' cantons.

== Opposition ==
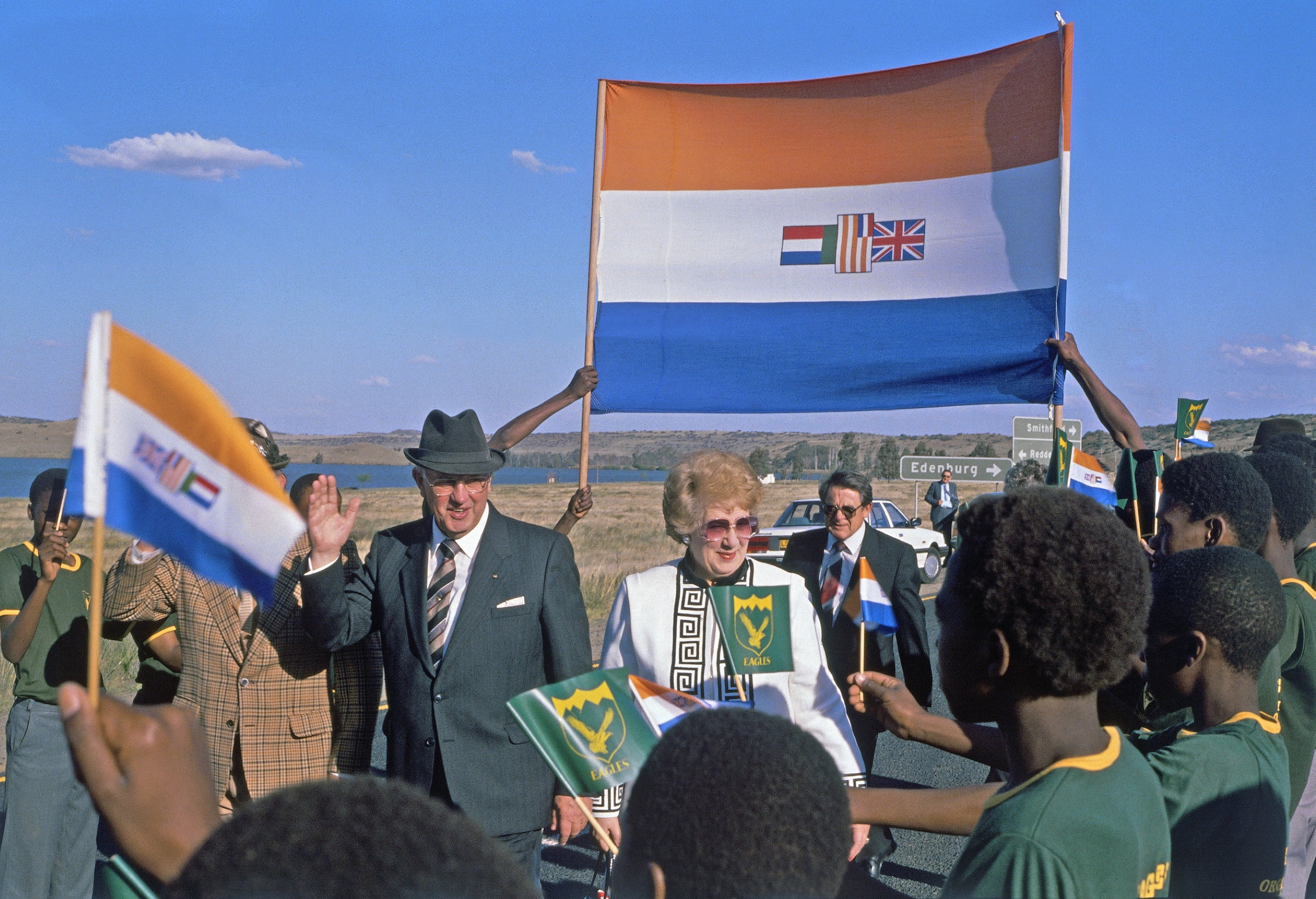
Display of the flag during a 1989 public appearance by State President and apartheid hardliner P. W. Botha. Opposition to the flag stemmed from its association with the apartheid regime.

Despite the flag's origins and adoption pre-dating the National Party's ascension to power by twenty years, the flag gradually became associated with the apartheid regime. Movements like the Black Sash and uMkhonto we Sizwe started protesting against it with their own symbols. Often, the flag of South Africa would be removed from public display and replaced with the banned ANC flag. The flag would also be the subject of public burnings during anti-apartheid protests.

After 1989, F. W. de Klerk became the last State President of South Africa and immediately unbanned the African National Congress (ANC) and released their leader, Nelson Mandela, from prison. De Klerk instigated negotiations to end apartheid in South Africa with Mandela's ANC. One of the ANC's demands was that the flag gradually decrease in usage in South African life and that a new flag be created, as black South Africans associated the current one with apartheid and Afrikaner nationalism.

The negotiations led to the 1992 South African apartheid referendum where the white part of the South African populace (all other groups still being disenfranchised) voted to end apartheid. The referendum decision resulted in the International Rugby Football Board allowing the South African rugby team to play test matches again. The ANC agreed to endorse the team on the condition that the flag not be used to represent South Africa. During the return test, the Conservative Party handed out numerous flags to the majority white crowd as a symbol of defiance against the ANC. At the 1992 Summer Olympics in Barcelona, the South African team performed under a specially designed flag for the National Olympic Committee of South Africa, although white South African spectators at the games waved the then national flag, despite attempts by officials to stop them.

In 1994, the State Herald of South Africa, Fred Brownell, was approached to design a new national flag for South Africa to replace the flag in time for the first elections after apartheid. He designed the new flag of South Africa with a combination of the old flag and the colours of the ANC flag. The new flag design was approved personally by both de Klerk and Mandela before being unanimously approved by the Transitional Executive Council on 15 March 1994.

De Klerk made the public proclamation of the replacement of the old flag on 20 April, seven days before the 1994 South African general election on 27 April 1994. When the flag was lowered for the last time at the parliament building in Cape Town, anti-apartheid onlookers approvingly shouted "Down, down!" as it was removed.

== After 1994 ==
The post-1994 flag of South Africa

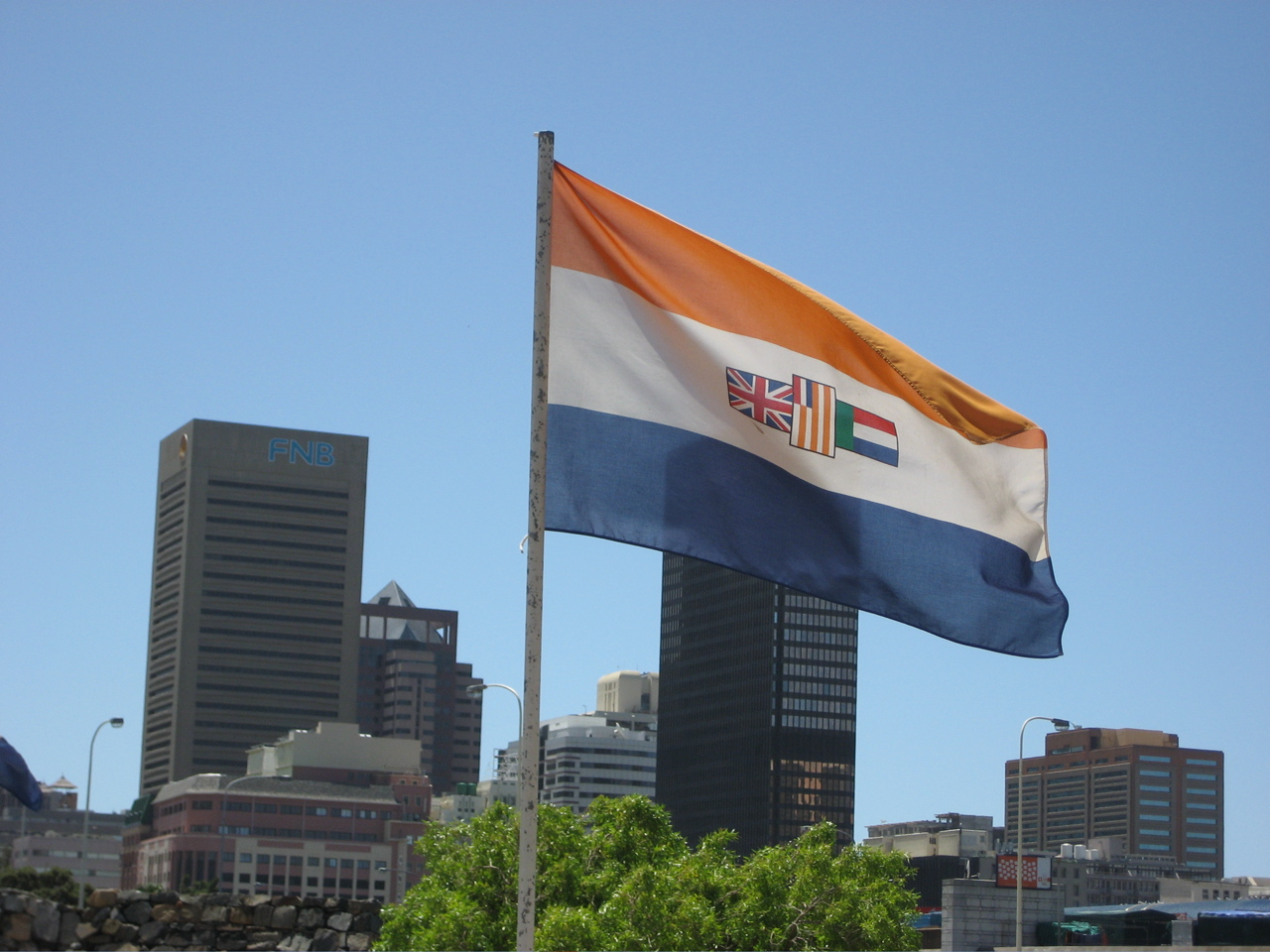
The flag at the Castle of Good Hope in 2006

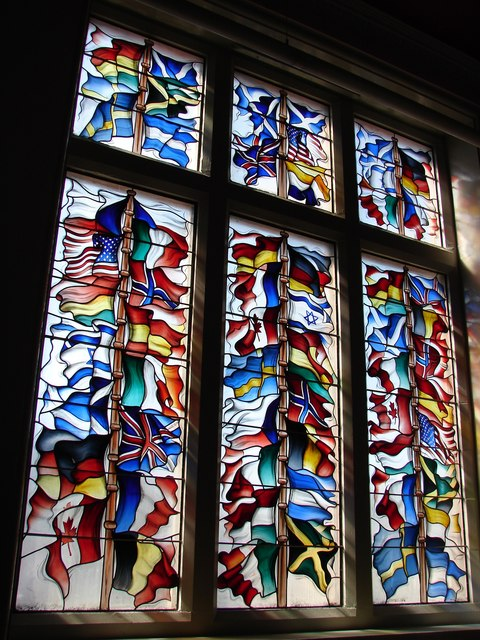
An example of the pre-1994 flag of South Africa being used for historical purposes. This is a stained-glass window in Lockerbie Town Hall in Scotland, commemorating the Pan Am Flight 103 disaster of 1988, in which one South African died. The pre-1994 flag (without the lesser flags) can be seen at the top centre and bottom right

Following its official retirement as the flag of South Africa, the flag was adopted by some white South Africans as being a symbol of Afrikaner heritage and history. Many South Africans still view it as a symbol of apartheid and therefore have strongly discouraged its use. Despite the negative associations, it was never banned by the Government of South Africa post-1994, and the right to display it in South Africa was protected under Chapter Two of the Constitution of South Africa as an expression of free speech until 2019. In the 21st century, the flag experienced use as a symbol by white supremacists in and outside South Africa. A particular awareness of this followed the shooting of black parishioners at a Charleston, South Carolina church in 2015, as the perpetrator, Dylann Roof, had previously been pictured wearing a jacket with two flag patches of the flag and the flag of white-ruled Rhodesia (now Zimbabwe) attached on it. This association with apartheid and racism often led to calls for the flags that were used in a historical context to be removed from display. An example of this is in Cooma, Australia, where until 2023 it was flown to commemorate South African workers in the Snowy Mountains Scheme alongside the Canadian Red Ensign, 49-star US flag, and other flags from 1959 when the Avenue was dedicated.

The flag has also been used as a symbol of protest post-1994. In 2005, a statue of Venda King Makhado was vandalised in Louis Trichardt with the colours of the flag as a protest against a proposal to change the name of the town to Makhado. Some South Africans in the 21st century started to fly the flag as a protest against what they perceived as the failure of the ANC to make progress in governing South Africa as a democracy.

At Cape Town's Castle of Good Hope, the flag was flown from the castle alongside the Union Jack, flag of the Netherlands and the current flag of South Africa to display the powers that ruled South Africa through history. In 1994, it was agreed that they would remain on the castle parapet as historical reference. However, in 2012, following complaints from the ANC member of parliament Nomfunelo Mabedla, all the flags apart from the current flag of South Africa were removed from the parapet, and the removed flags were placed in the castle's museum. The flag is also collected in some other museums in South Africa, including the South African Naval Museum.

In 2008, the flag was mistakenly put on posters in Ghana advertising that year's Africa Cup of Nations, sparking indignation among some South Africans.

The flag was declared illegal for public display in South Africa in August 2019, when the Equality Court classified it as hate speech, with heavy enforcing penalties. Exceptions were made for academic, journalistic & artistic expression and museums & places of historical interest. Judge Phineas Mojapelo declared that "Displaying [the apartheid flag] is destructive of our nascent non-racial democracy… it is an affront to the spirit and values of botho / ubuntu, which has become a mark of civilized interaction in post-apartheid South Africa". When AfriForum appealed against the ban in the Supreme Court of Appeal in 2022, respondents represented by advocate Ngcukaitobi argued that the flag was meant to unite white South Africans against the native population, and that it was invented by the architects of apartheid to represent racial segregation. Mark Oppenheimer, a lawyer for AfriForum, argued that use of the flag is not necessarily an endorsement of apartheid. In 2023, the ban was partially upheld by the Supreme Court which ruled that "gratuitous" display was unlawful but did not rule on if private display was unlawful.

== Gallery ==
Flag from 1928 to 1982
54 years of use

Flag from 1982 to 1994
12 years of use

Prince's Flag

The flags of the UK, Orange Free State and South African Republic, as centre motif of the national flag used from 1928 to 1982

The flags of the UK, Orange Free State and South African Republic, as centre motif of the national flag used from 1982 to 1994

Uncommon 1:2 version, seen on "South Africa Marches On (1941)"

Uncommon 1:2 version, in alternative proportions and colours from 1982 to 1994

Flag of South Africa (1928–1994) without Union Jack used by Kommandokorps

Afrikaner Weerstandsbeweging variant of the flag of South Africa (1928–1994)
The multiple flags on the South African flag

Dutch Prince's flag

Mirrored 2:3 version of the flag of the United Kingdom
(left)

Flag of the Orange Free State
(middle)

Flag of the South African Republic
(right)
Other relevant flags

Afrikaner Vryheidsvlag, used by Afrikaner Volksfront
(left)

Flag of the State President of South Africa (1984–1994), using Prinsenvlag inspired colours
(right)

== See also ==
- Coat of arms of South Africa (1910–2000)
- "Die Stem van Suid-Afrika"
- Flag of Rhodesia
- Flag of South Africa, the successor
- List of South African flags
- List of symbols designated by the Anti-Defamation League as hate symbols
- South African Red Ensign, the predecessor
