= Flag of South Africa =

Republic of South Africa
- Rainbow Flag; Seskleur
- Use: Civil and state flag, civil and state ensign
- Proportion: 2:3
- Adopted: 27 April 1994; 32 years ago
- Design: A horizontal bicolour of red and Dark blue with a Deep black isosceles triangle based on the hoist-side and a Dark green pall, a central Dark green band that splits into a horizontal Y, centred over the partition lines and was edged in both white against the red and the blue bands and Gold against the triangle, in which the arms of the Y ends at the corners of the hoist and embraces the triangle on the hoist-side.
- Designed by: Frederick Brownell
- South African National Defence Force
- Use: War flag
- Adopted: 25 April 2003; 23 years ago
- South African Naval Ensign
- Use: Naval ensign
- Adopted: 16 March 1998; 28 years ago

The national flag of South Africa was designed in March 1994 and adopted on 27 April 1994, during South Africa's 1994 general election, to replace the previous flag used from 1928–1994.

The flag has horizontal bands of red (on the top) and blue (on the bottom), of equal width, separated by a central green band which splits into a horizontal "Y" shape, the arms of which end at the corners of the hoist side (and follow the flag's diagonals). The "Y" embraces a black isosceles triangle from which the arms are separated by narrow gold bands; the red and blue bands are separated from the green band and its arms by narrow white stripes. The stripes at the fly end are in the 5:1:3:1:5 ratio. Three of the flag's colours were taken from the flag of South Africa (1928–1994), itself derived from the flag of the Netherlands, and the Union Jack, while the remaining three colours were taken from the flag of the African National Congress. Nicknames for the flag include the Seskleur (lit. 'six colour' in Afrikaans) and the Rainbow Flag.

== Colours ==
At the time of its adoption, the South African flag was the only national flag in the world to comprise six colours in its primary design, without a seal and brocade. The design and colours are a synopsis of the principal elements of the country's flag history. The colours themselves have no essential meaning.

Colours	Textile colour	Pantone equivalent	RGB hexadecimal	RGB decimal
Green	CKS 42 c Spectrum green	3415 C	#007A4D	0, 122, 77
Black	CKS 401 c Blue black		#000000	0, 0, 0
White	CKS 701 c National flag white		#FFFFFF	255, 255, 255
Gold	CKS 724 c Gold yellow	1235 C	#FFB612	255, 182, 18
Red	CKS 750 c Chilli red	179 C	#DE3831	222, 56, 49
Blue	CKS 762 c National flag blue	Reflex Blue C	#002395	0, 35, 149

== Symbolism ==
According to official South African government information, the South African flag is "a synopsis of principal elements of the country's flag history." Although different people may attribute personal symbolism to the individual colours or colour combinations, "no universal symbolism should be attached to any of the colours." The only symbolism in the flag is the V- or Y-shaped motif, which can be interpreted as "the convergence of diverse elements within South African society, taking the road ahead in unity." Frederick Gordon Brownell who created the flag has said that the green Y-shaped part of the flag was influenced by the chasubles worn by Anglican priests, and stated that he was influenced to include it as he grew up Anglican.

From time to time, explanations of the meanings or symbolism of the flag's colours are published in various media, including official government publications and speeches by government officials.

The flag consists of the four colours of the Vierkleur, expanded by the addition of black and gold, signifying South Africa's mineral wealth. Three of the colours – black, green, and gold – are found in the flag of the African National Congress. The other three – red, white, and blue – are used in the modern flag of the Netherlands and the flag of the United Kingdom; the colours white and blue were also found in the old flag of South Africa. Former South African State President F.W. de Klerk, who proclaimed the new flag on 20 April 1994, stated in his autobiography, The Last Trek: a New Beginning, that chilli red was chosen instead of plain red (which Anglo-Africans would have preferred) or orange (as some Afrikaners would have preferred).

== History ==
=== 1902–1910 ===
The South African Republic
- Vierkleur

The Second Boer War between 1899 and 1902 ended with the Treaty of Vereeniging on 31 May 1902. As such, the former Boer Republics of the Orange Free State and the Zuid-Afrikaanse Republiek (Transvaal) became British colonies, joining with the existing Cape and Natal colonies. Each was also entitled to a colonial flag, in keeping with the British tradition.

=== 1910–1928 ===
On 31 May 1910, these four colonies united to form the Union of South Africa; the individual colonial flags were no longer used, and new South African flags were introduced. Once again, as a British dominion, the Union Jack continued to serve as the national flag, and the standard British ensign pattern served as the basis for distinctive South African flags.

As was the case throughout the British Empire, the Red and Blue Ensigns were the official flags for merchant and government vessels at sea, and the British Admiralty authorised them to be defaced in the fly with the shield from the South African coat of arms. These ensigns were not intended to be used as the Union's national flag. However, some people used them in this manner. Although these ensigns were primarily intended for maritime use, they were also flown on land.

The South Africa Red Ensign was South Africa's de facto national flag between 1910 and 1928 and was flown at times from Government buildings.

The design of the Red Ensign was slightly modified in 1912, when the shield was placed on a white disc to improve legibility. The Red Ensign continued to be used as the flag of the South African merchant marine until 1951.

A variant of South Africa Red Ensign with the full coat of arms of South Africa on a white disc. Commonly flown by civilians.

The Blue Ensign was flown over the Union's offices abroad between 1910 and 1928.

These flags never enjoyed much popular support due to the animosities lingering after the Anglo-Boer War – the Afrikaner descendants of the Dutch settlers from the former Boer Republics saw it as a British flag, and the English-speakers saw it as not the Union Flag alone.

=== 1928–1994 ===
South Africa
- "Oranje, Blanje, Blou" "Union flag" "Apartheid flag"
- Use: National flag, civil and state ensign
- Proportion: 2:3
- Adopted: 31 May 1928 (dark version); 1982 (bright version)
- Relinquished: 20 April 1994
- Design: Three horizontal bands of orange, white and blue with three small flags (the Union Jack to the left, the vertical version of the flag of the Orange Free State in the centre and the flag of the South African Republic to the right) centred on the white band.
- Adopted: 1982
- Relinquished: 20 April 1994
- Design: Bright colours

Due to the lack of popularity of these flags, there were intermittent discussions about the desirability of a more distinctive national flag for South Africa after 1910, it was only after a coalition government took office in 1925 that a bill was introduced in Parliament to introduce a national flag for the Union. This provoked an often violent controversy that lasted three years over whether the British Union Flag should be included in the new flag design. The Natal Province even threatened to secede from the Union should it be decided to remove it.

Finally, a compromise was reached, resulting in the adoption of a separate flag for the Union in late 1927, and the design was first hoisted on 31 May 1928. The design was based on the so-called Van Riebeeck flag, or "Prince's Flag" (Prinsenvlag in Afrikaans), which was originally the Dutch flag; it consisted of orange, white, and blue horizontal stripes. A version of this flag had been used as the flag of the Dutch East India Company (known as the VOC) at the Cape (with the VOC logo in the centre) from 1652 until 1795. The South African addition to the design was the inclusion of three smaller flags centred in the white stripe. The miniature flags were the British Union Flag (mirrored) towards the hoist, the flag of the Orange Free State hanging vertically in the middle, and the Transvaal Vierkleur towards the fly. The positions of the miniature flags ensure that each has equal status. However, to ensure that the Dutch flag in the canton of the Orange Free State flag is placed nearest to the upper hoist of the main flag, the Free State flag must be reversed. The British Union Flag, which is nearest to the hoist and is thus in a more favoured position, is spread horizontally from the Free State flag towards the hoist and is thus also reversed. Although placed horizontally furthest from the hoist, the Vierkleur is the only miniature flag that is oriented in the same direction as the main flag. This compensates for its otherwise less favourable position. In this arrangement, each of the miniature flags enjoys equal precedence. Note that the miniature flags of the Transvaal Republic and the Orange Free State both contain miniature flags of the Netherlands. In contrast, the miniature flag of the United Kingdom is a composition of the flags of England, Scotland, and the Anglo-Irish people, making the old South African flag the only former national flag in the world containing five flags within three flags within a flag.

The choice of the Prinsenvlag (which was believed to be the first flag hoisted on South African soil by Jan van Riebeeck of the VOC) as the basis upon which to design the South African flag had more to do with compromise than Afrikaner political desires, since the Prinsenvlag was politically neutral, as it was no longer the national flag of any nation. A further element of this compromise was that the British Union Flag would continue to fly alongside the new South African national flag over official buildings. This dual flag arrangement continued until 1957 when the British Union Flag lost its official status per an Act of Parliament.

Following the 1960 South African republic referendum, the country became a republic on 31 May 1961, but the flag's design remained unchanged. However, there was intense pressure to change the flag, particularly from Afrikaners who still resented the fact that the British Union Flag was part of it. In 1968, the then Prime Minister, John Vorster, proposed the adoption of a new flag from 1971, to commemorate the tenth anniversary of the declaration of a republic, but this never materialised.

Since 2019, public display of this flag in South Africa is generally considered hate speech (for being a potential symbol of apartheid and white supremacy) and therefore prohibited, with exceptions for artistic, academic, and journalistic purposes, as well as for museums and places of historical interest.

Flag from 1928–1982

Flag from 1982–1994

=== 1994–present ===
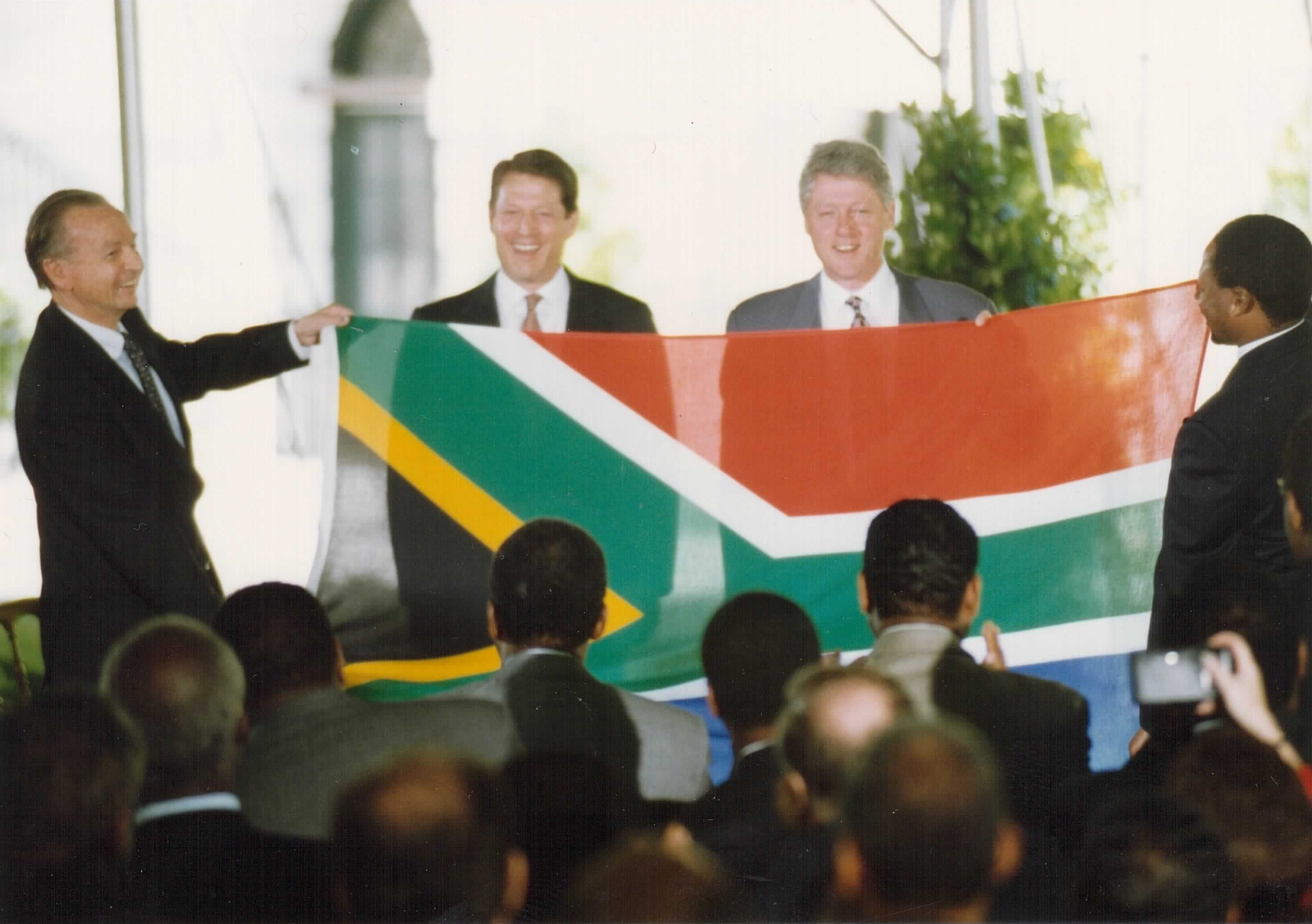
South African Ambassador to the U.S. Harry Schwarz presenting the new flag to the U.S. president Bill Clinton and vice president Al Gore in May 1994.

The present South African national flag was first flown on 27 April 1994, the day of the 1994 election. However, the flag was initially intended as an interim flag, and its design was decided only a week earlier.

The choice of a new flag was part of the negotiation process initiated when Nelson Mandela was released from prison in 1990. When a nationwide public competition was held in 1993, the National Symbols Commission received more than 7,000 designs. Six designs were shortlisted and presented to the public and the Negotiating Council, but none elicited enthusiastic support. Many design studios were subsequently contacted to submit further proposals, but these were not favourably received. Parliament went into recess at the end of 1993 without a suitable candidate for the new national flag.

In February 1994, Cyril Ramaphosa and Roelf Meyer, the chief negotiators of the African National Congress and the National Party government of the day, respectively, were given the task of resolving the flag issue. A final design was adopted on 15 March 1994, derived from a design developed by the State Herald Fred Brownell, (Note: Eastern Cape artist Thembani Hastings Mqhayi believes that Brownell is wrongly credited and proposes that the flag is based on one of several designs that he submitted in 1994. In response, the Minister of Sports, Arts and Culture, Nathi Mthethwa, denied that Mqhayi's submissions played a part. See: Sangotsha, Vuyolwethu (16 August 2022). "Eastern Cape artist claiming to be rightful designer of SA's flag, takes matter to court". dispatchlive.co.za. DispatchLive.) who had also claimed to have previously designed the Namibian flag. This interim flag was hoisted officially for the first time on 27 April 1994, the day when the nation's first fully inclusive elections commenced which resulted in Nelson Mandela being inaugurated as South Africa's first democratically elected president on 10 May 1994. The flag was well received by most South Africans, though a small minority objected to it; hundreds of Afrikaner Volksfront members in Bloemfontein burned the flag in protest a few weeks before the April 1994 elections.

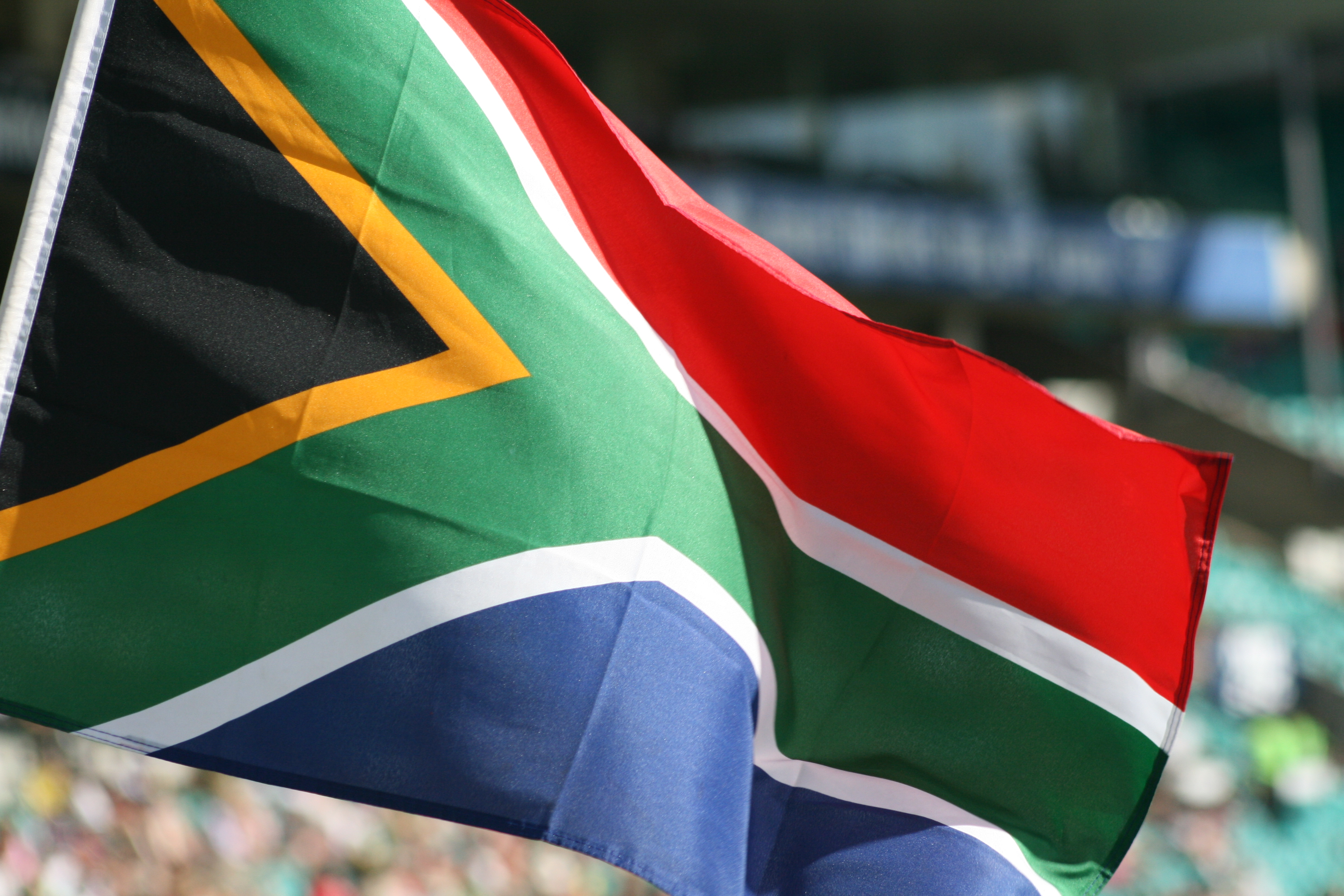
The flag flying at the Sydney Cricket Ground.

The proclamation of the new national flag by South African President F. W. de Klerk was only published on 20 April 1994, a mere seven days before the flag was to be inaugurated, sparking a frantic last-minute flurry for flag manufacturers. As stated in South Africa's post-apartheid interim constitution, the flag was to be introduced for a five-year probationary period, after which there would be discussion about whether to change the national flag in the final draft of the constitution. The Constitutional Assembly was charged with drafting the country's new constitution and had called for submissions, inter alia, on the various national symbols. It received 118 submissions recommending the retention of the new flag and 35 suggesting changes to it. Thus, on 28 September 1995, it was decided to retain the flag unchanged. Accordingly, it was included as Section One of the Constitution of South Africa, which came into force in February 1997.

== Proper display of the flag ==
The South African government published guidelines for proper display of the flag at designated flag stations, in Government Notice 510 of 8 June 2001 (Gazette number 22356). These rules apply only to official flag stations and not to the general public.

The Southern African Vexillological Association (SAVA), a non-official association for the study of flags, published its own guide for the proper display of the flag in 2002. This guide has no official authority but was drawn up with generally accepted vexillological etiquette and principles in mind.

== Official description ==
An addendum to the Transitional Executive Council agenda (April 1994) described the flag in pseudo-heraldic terms as follows:

The National flag shall be rectangular in the proportion of two in the width to three to the length; per pall from the hoist, the upper band red (chilli) and lower band blue, with a black triangle at the hoist; over the partition lines a green pall one fifth the width of the flag, fimbriated white against the red and blue, and gold against the black triangle at the hoist, and the width of the pall and its fimbriations is one third the width of the flag.

Schedule One of the Constitution of South Africa (1996) replaced the heraldic definition and described the flag in plain English as follows:

1. The national flag is rectangular; it is one and a half times as long as it is wide.
2. It is black, gold, green, white, chilli red and blue.
3. It has a green Y-shaped band that is one-fifth as wide as the flag. The centre lines of the band start in the top and bottom corners next to the flag post, converge in the centre of the flag, and continue horizontally to the middle of the free edge.
4. The green band is edged, above and below in white, and towards the flag post end, in gold. Each edging is one-fifteenth as wide as the flag.
5. The triangle next to the flag post is black.
6. The upper horizontal band is chilli red and the lower horizontal band is blue. These bands are each one-third as wide as the flag.

== See also ==
- List of South African flags
- Coat of arms of South Africa
- National anthem of South Africa
- National symbols of South Africa
- Southern African Vexillological Association
