= Postage stamps and postal history of British Bechuanaland =

This is a survey of the postage stamps and postal history of British Bechuanaland.

== History ==
For many months, starting in 1883, pressure was placed on the British Government to do something in Bechuanaland because of unrest in the area. On 29 October 1884 the British Government appointed Sir Charles Warren as Special Commissioner of Bechuanaland. On 13 November 1884 Parliament voted a sum of £675,000 (this is equivalent to over £32 million today) for military operations in Bechuanaland. Sir Charles Warren was authorised to recruit an irregular force of 1,500 in South Africa in addition to the regular troops that would be provided.

A force of 4,000 troops, under Sir Charles Warren, set off to annex Stellaland and Goshen. On 7 February 1885 the force reached Vryburg, the principal town in Stellaland, then continued to Mafeking, the principal town in Goshen. By 8 April 1885 Sir Charles Warren sent a despatch to notify the British Government that he had occupied Bechuanaland and had entirely restored order. The two Boer republics had collapsed without any bloodshed.

On 30 September 1885 Stellaland, Goshen and other territories to the south of the Molopo River were constituted as the Crown Colony of British Bechuanaland.

== Stamps ==
Stellaland stamps, which had been issued in 1884, continued to be used until 2 December 1885. Any external mail had to be franked with both Stellaland stamps and Cape of Good Hope stamps. The cancellations on these stamps was by pen and ink. Stellaland stamps are known used by Warren's Force at Kimberley. These stamps were withdrawn from use on 2 December 1885. All the unused withdrawn stamps were sold to a stamp dealer, Whitfield, King & Company of Ipswich.

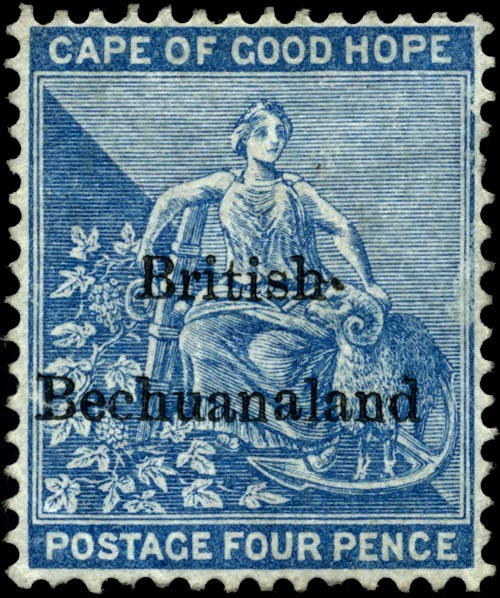
Overprinted Cape Stamp, 1885

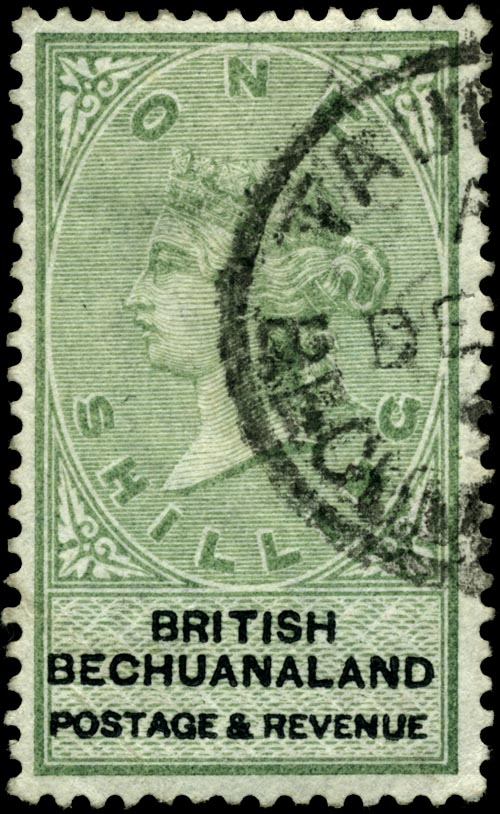
Overprinted British Stamp, 1887

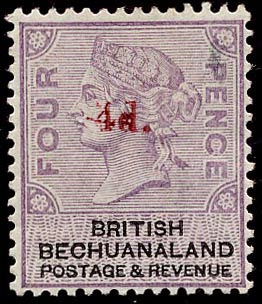
British Bechaunaland 1888 overprinted 4d on four pence

On 2 December 1885 stamps from Cape of Good Hope overprinted 'British Bechuanaland' were made available at Vryburg post office. Eight different values from ½d to 1s were overprinted by W A Richards & Son of Cape Town.

On 1 November 1887 a supply of stamps from Great Britain was issued. The ½d stamp was a Great Britain stamp overprinted 'BRITISH BECHUANLAND', by De La Rue. Twelve other value ranging in value from 1d to £5 were produced by De La Rue using blank ‘Unappropriated Die’ designs for British fiscal stamps and overprinting them with 'British Bechuanaland Postage and Revenue'.

The stamps produced using the ‘Unappropriated Die’ designs had values in text. On 7 August 1888 the five low values were overprinted locally in Vryburg, by P Townshend & Co, to show the value in numbers; 1d, 2d, 4d, 6d and 1s.

In December 1888 3d stamps of the 1887 issue were overprinted 'One Half-Penny' and in January 1889 Cape of Good Hope ½d stamps were overprinted 'British Bechuanaland' by the local printer in Vryburg.

In 1893 responsibility for the postal services was transferred from the Postmaster-General of British Bechuanaland to the Postmaster-General of the Cape of Good Hope.

A further seven stamps were produced by overprinting either Cape Colony stamps or British stamps before British Bechuanaland was annexed by the Cape of Good Hope on 16 November 1895 and ceased to issue stamps.

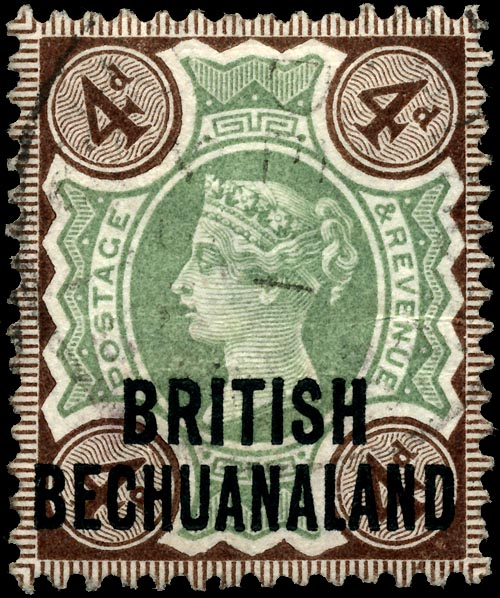
Overprinted British Stamp, 1891

All the remaining stamps of British Bechuanaland were transferred to the Bechuanaland Protectorate and continued to be used there, without any overprints, until 1897.

== Postal stationery ==
All items of postal stationery produced for British Bechuanaland were by overprinting Cape of Good Hope or British items of stationery BRITISH BECHUANALAND or British Bechuanaland.

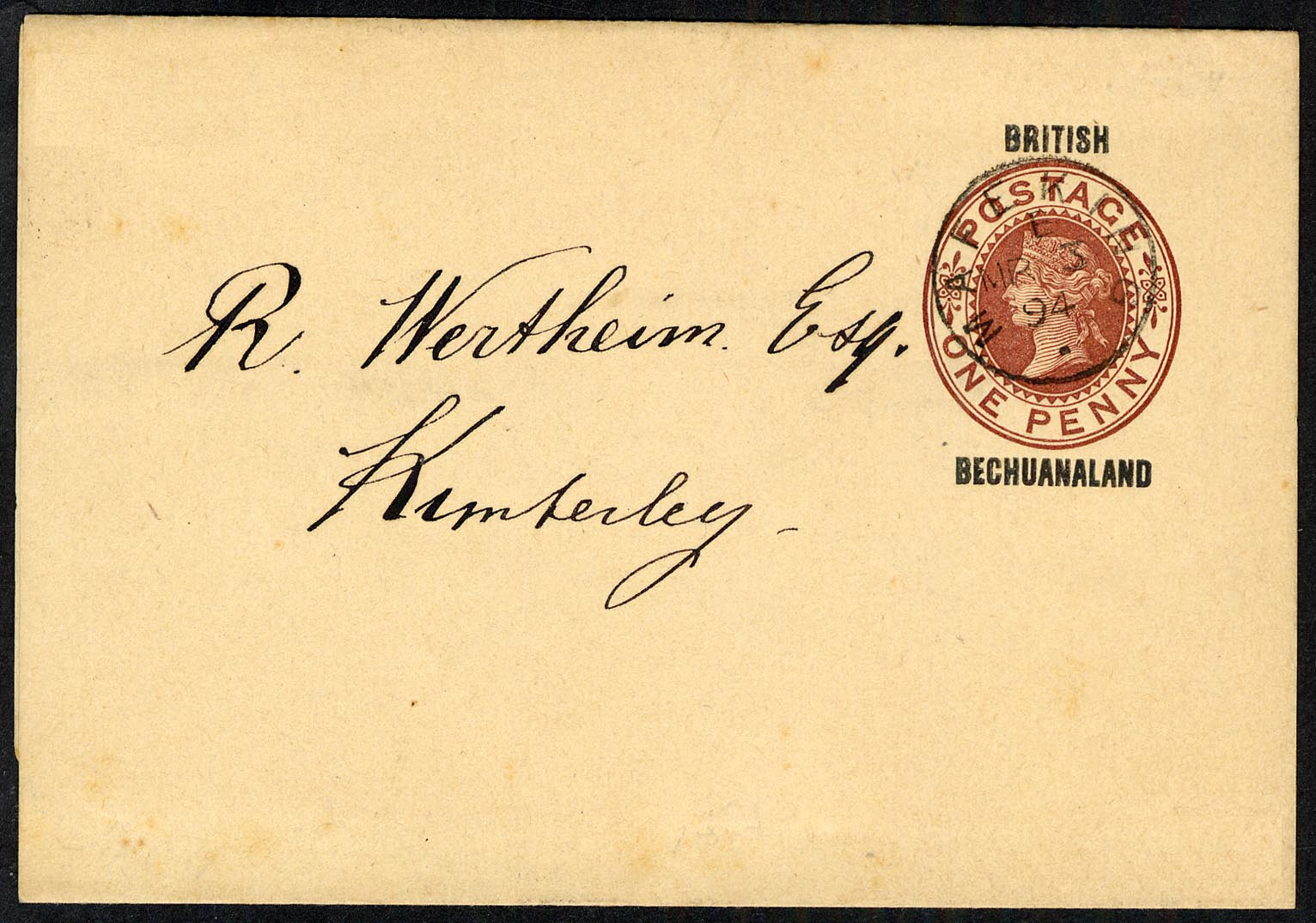
British Bechuanaland 1d Newspaper wrapper used 3 March 1894 at Mafeking to Kimberley - the newspaper rate at the time was ½d.

The first postcards were overprinted 1d Cape of Good Hope postcards and were issued in July 1886. A total of six different overprints on 1d Cape of Good Hope postcard were printed by W A Richards & Son of Cape Town and there were two printings on 1d British postcards. The 1d rate was for local and southern Africa.

New rates of postage were introduced following the UPU 1891 Congress in Vienna. Local rate was ½d and 1d; Great Britain rate was 1d; International and Mashonaland rate was 1½d. In March 1893 a 1½d Cape of Good Hope postcard was overprinted and issued. In September 1894 a British ½d postcard was additionally overprinted THREE HALF PENCE and at the same time ½d British postcards overprinted BRITISH BECHUANALAND were supplied.

The first newspaper wrappers were issued in January 1897 by overprinting British newspaper wrappers. The newspaper rate was ½d local and 1d for Great Britain. In total there were two different printings on ½d British wrappers, one printings on 1d British wrappers, two each on ½d and 1d newspaper wrappers from Cape of Good Hope.

Registration envelopes were first introduced in July 1886. A total of 17 different printings have been identified of which eleven are on Cape of Good Hope envelopes and six are on British envelopes.

== See also ==
- Postage stamps and postal history of Bechuanaland Protectorate
- Postage stamps and postal history of Stellaland Republic

== References and sources ==
Sources

- Holmes, H. R., The Postage Stamps, Postal Stationery, and Postmarks of the Bechuanalands, Royal Philatelic Society (1971)
- H. R. Holmes Collection, The Bechuanalands. Auction catalog, Sale 4327, Harmers of London (October 29, 1981)
- Thy, Peter & Inglefield-Watson, John, The Postal Stationery of the Bechuanalands and Botswana, British Philatelic Trust, 2004, ISBN 1-871777-13-5
- Peter Thy, "Bechuanaland Literature", Forerunner, No. 41, p. 17-18, 2002. Also on line
- Peter Thy, "The Revenue Stamps of Bechuanaland", Forerunner. No. 45, p. 60-63, 2003. Also on line.
