= Bechuanaland Expedition =

1884–1885 British military expedition to present-day Botswana

- Part of the Boer Wars
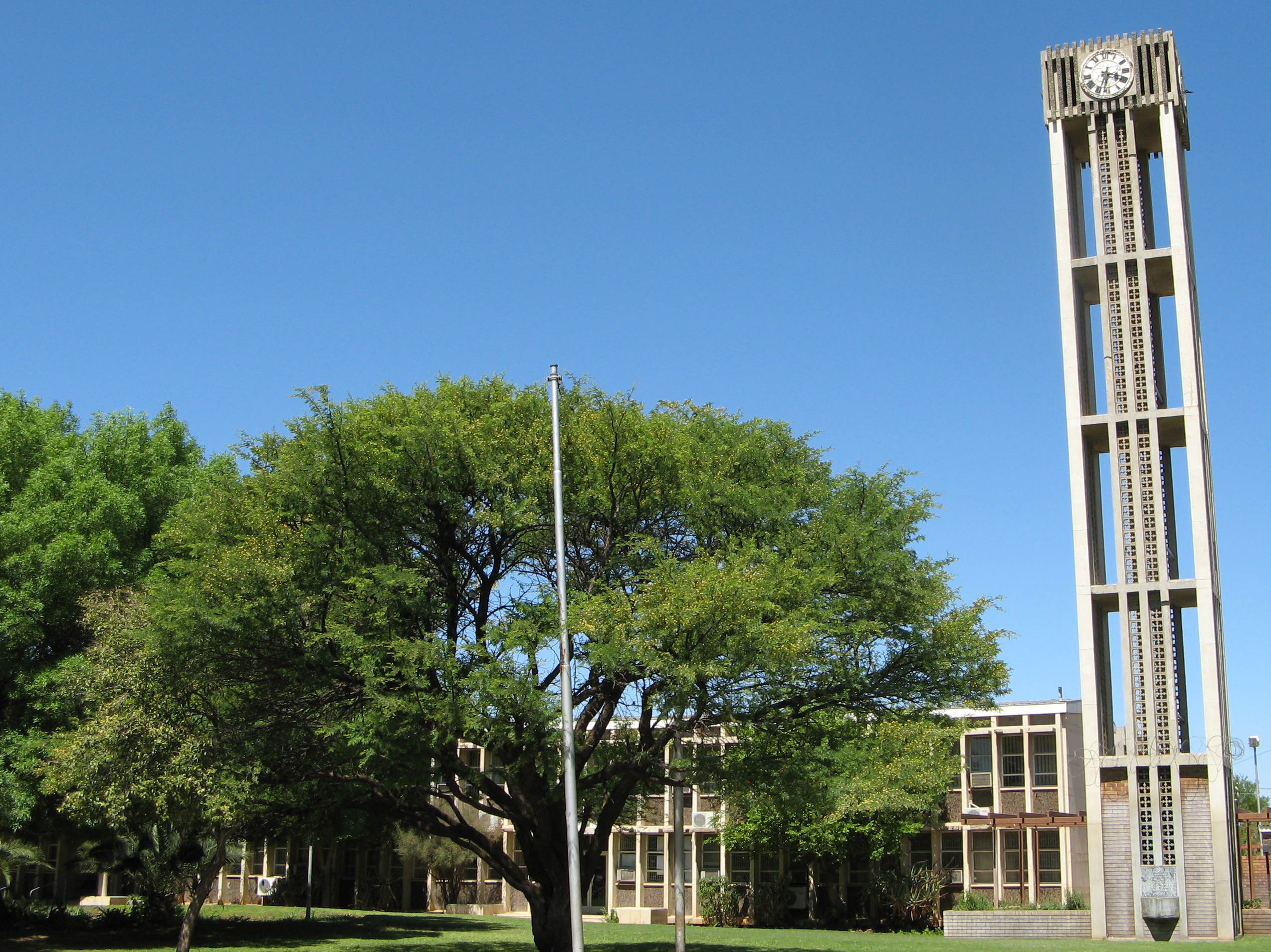
- Town hall of modern-day Vryburg
Date	December 1884–August 1885
Location	Southern Africa
Result	British victory: British annexation of Stellaland is successful

Belligerents
Stellaland; South African Republic	United Kingdom: (United Kingdom) British Bechuanaland

Commanders and leaders
(Stellaland) Gerrit Jacobus van Niekerk (South African Republic) Paul Kruger	(United Kingdom) Sir Charles Warren (United Kingdom) Cecil Rhodes

The Bechuanaland Expedition or Warren Expedition, of late 1884/1885, was a British military expedition to the Tswana country, to assert British sovereignty in the face of encroachments from Germany and the Transvaal, and to suppress the Boer states of Stellaland and Goshen.

== History ==
In December 1884, Major-General Charles Warren was sent as HM Special Commissioner to command a military expedition to Bechuanaland, to assert British sovereignty in the face of encroachments from Germany and the Transvaal, and to suppress the Boer states of Stellaland and Goshen, which were backed by the Transvaal. Warren's force of 4,000 British and local troops headed north from Cape Town, accompanied by the first three observation balloons ever used by the British Army in the field. On 22 January, Warren met the Boer leader Paul Kruger at the Modder River where Kruger sought to bring the expedition to a halt on the basis that he would take responsibility for maintaining order in the Tswana country. Warren did not abandon his march, however, and on reaching the area he dissolved the republics of Stellaland and Goshen without bloodshed and in July proclaimed a British protectorate. In September he halved the size of the protectorate by proclaiming the Crown colony of British Bechuanaland, its northern border following the Molopo and Nossob rivers. Warren was recalled in September 1885.

An interesting sidelight on the expedition is related by Jose Burman, who writes that when Warren’s force reached Orange River station (at that stage the terminus of the railway line to Kimberley, as the bridge over the river had not yet been built) the general had a transport problem.

“At this stage Warren’s difficulties were solved by a number of farmers who arrived at the river and offered their services as transport riders. Warren accepted their services gratefully, and they were paid £2 a day. With their help the expeditionary force advanced cautiously into Bechuanaland. Stellaland accepted British rule – but Goshen did not, and Warren headed for Mafikeng. When he arrived he found that the Goshenites were no longer in residence, having mysteriously disappeared. Goshen was then proclaimed part of British Bechuanaland.

“Later it transpired that the helpful transport riders whom Warren had been paying £2 per day were mostly Goshenites who thus earned enough to buy farms at a later stage.”

Scottish missionary John Mackenzie (1835–99), who accompanied Warren, described his experiences with the expedition in an 1887 work, Austral Africa: Losing It or Ruling It.
