= Postage stamps and postal history of Bechuanaland Protectorate =

This is a survey of the postage stamps and postal history of Bechuanaland Protectorate.

== First stamps ==
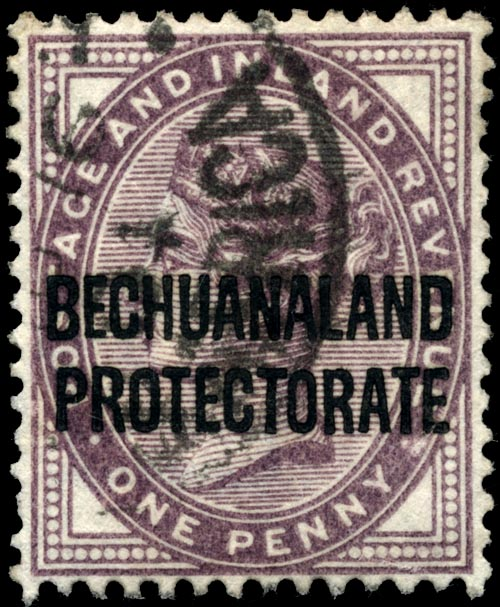
1897 overprint

The first Bechuanaland Protectorate postage stamps were produced in 1888 by overprinting stamps of British Bechuanaland (some overprints of British stamps and some issued specifically for the colony) with "Protectorate". In 1889 a 1/2-penny stamp of Cape of Good Hope was overprinted "Bechuanaland / Protectorate".

From 1897 to 1925 more British stamps were overprinted using the protectorate's name in various layouts. In 1910 a 6-pence stamp of Transvaal was also overprinted; although it was intended for fiscal use, postal uses are known.

== George V ==
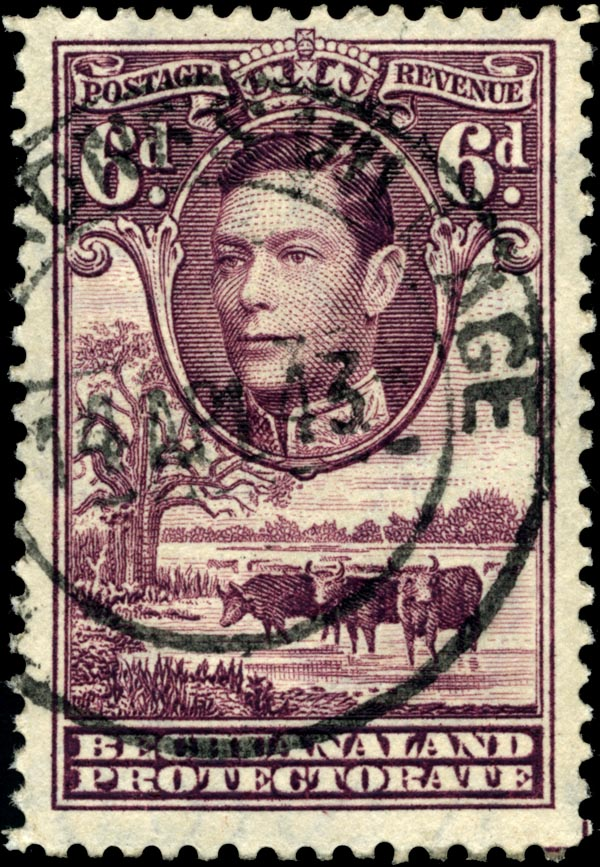
6-pence of 1938, used in 1943 at Gaberone's Village, later Gaborone

The first stamps inscribed Bechuanaland Protectorate appeared in 1932. The 12 values, ranging from 1/2d to 10 shillings, all used the same design; a group of cattle next to a baobab tree, surmounted by a portrait for King George V. The usual Silver Jubilee issue appeared in 1935.

== George VI ==
A Coronation issue appeared in 1937 and a definitive series in 1938 with King George VI replacing his father on the 1932 series.

The protectorate's Peace issue of 1945 was produced by overprinting "Bechuanaland" on South Africa's Peace stamps. Stamps were issued for the Royal visit in 1947, and for the usual omnibus sets of the period.

== Queen Elizabeth ==
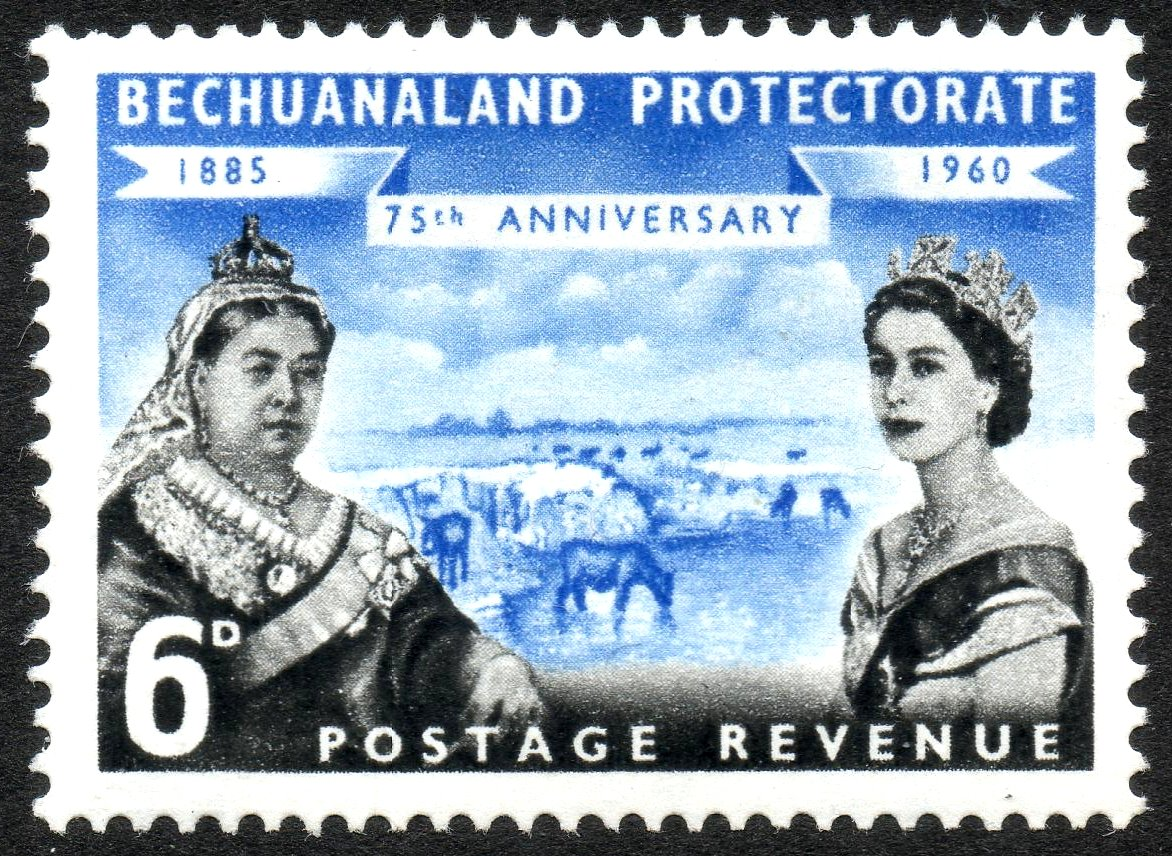
75th Anniversary Of The Protectorate

Queen Elizabeth II replaced her father in a definitive series of 1955, the rest of the design matching the previous definitives.

Three stamps in 1960 commemorated the 75th anniversary of the protectorate, then in 1961 Bechuanaland converted to the South African rand, necessitating surcharges on the existing definitives in February, followed by a new definitive series in October that was mostly pictures of birds, with some showing people at work.

Standard Commonwealth omnibus issues appeared up until independence, along with a 1 June 1966 issue commemorating the 25th anniversary of the Bechuanaland Pioneers and Gunners.

From 30 September 1966 the Bechuanaland Protectorate became the Republic of Botswana and stamps from that time were marked Botswana.

== See also ==
- Postage stamps and postal history of Botswana
- Postage stamps and postal history of British Bechuanaland
- The Tati Concessions Land, a territory originally part of the Matebele Kingdom and later incorporated into the Bechuanaland Protectorate, issued Revenue stamps in the 1890s.
- Stellaland, a break-away Boer republic from the Bechuanalands, issued its own stamps, described in Postage stamps and postal history of Stellaland Republic.

== References and sources ==
Sources

- Stanley Gibbons Ltd: various catalogues
- Rossiter, Stuart & John Flower. The Stamp Atlas. London: Macdonald, 1986. ISBN 0-356-10862-7
