= Mafikeng Aerodrome =

Former airport in Mahikeng, South Africa

Mafekeng Aerodrome
- IATA: none; ICAO: FAMK

Summary
- Airport type: Defunct
- Serves: Mahikeng, South Africa
- Location: Mmabatho
- Coordinates: 25°50′10″S 25°37′58″E

Map
- Location of airport in North West province Location of North West in South Africa

Runways
Direction	Length		Surface
Direction	ft	m	Surface
17/35	5,675	1,730	Gravelled

Mafekeng Aerodrome (ICAO: FAMK) was an airport that served Mafikeng, North West province in South Africa. It was located 2 kilometres northwest from Mahikeng city centre, presently in the Mahikeng Industrial district.

== History ==
In the 1930s, Resident Commissioner Charles Rey promoted civil aviation and worked with the Air Operating Company of South Africa (AOC). In 1932, Mafekeng Aerodrome was established, located on the Imperial Reserve at Mafekeng Headquarters. Due to its location, it was also known as the Mafekeng Headquarters Aerodrome. It was considered the second-best aerodrome in South Africa. Following establishment, AOC established a passenger and mail service at Mafekeng Aerodrome in 1934. The route commenced at Johannesburg and continued to Mafekeng, Serowe, Rakops, and ended at Maun. It was operated wirh a de Havilland Dragon Rapide. In 1935, a hangar was constructed at the aerodrome, and wireless equipment was also provided. Three Union Air Force aircraft were temporarily stationed at the aerodrome to conduct ground reconnaissance and an aerial survey for a permanent Johannesburg-Windhoek route.

In 1955-56, Portion Setlhopo of Mafekeng Municipal land was given in exchange for the aerodrome. During Operation Mayibuye in 1963, the Witwatersrand Native Labour Association (WNELA) controlled the aerodrome, which was the then recruiting corporation for South Africa's Chamber of Mines. The airstrip was used to transport migrant workers to mining compounds. It had refused permission for an East African Airways flight to land on the provisionally agreed date of 22 June 1963. Subsequently, on 18 June 1963, the Resident Commissioner of Mafekeng secured landing clearance after obtaining permission from WNELA. In 1971, the Mafikeng Flying Club, then known as the Beauchamp-Proctor Flying Club, was established at the aerodrome. It held meetings once a month.

=== Closure ===
Mafikeng Aerodrome was superseded by Mmabatho International Airport in June 1984.
