= Disaneng Dam =

- Interactive map of Disaneng Dam
- Official name: Disaneng Dam
- Location: North West, South Africa
- Coordinates: 25°49′25″S 25°18′20″E
- Opening date: 1980
- Operators: Department of Water Affairs and Forestry

Dam and spillways
- Type of dam: earthfill
- Impounds: Molopo River
- Height: 17 m
- Length: 780 m

Reservoir
- Creates: Disaneng Dam Reservoir
- Total capacity: 17 400 000 m³
- Surface area: 435.9 ha

Disaneng Dam, is an earth-fill type dam on the Molopo River in the Ratlou Local Municipality, near to the border of the Mahikeng Local Municipality and not far from Mmabatho, North West, South Africa. It was established in 1980 and its primary purpose is for irrigation.

It offers fishing opportunities for species such as carp, king carp, tilapia, catfish and recently introduced species of bass which is slowly taking over this dam. At the dam wall, there are huge gathering of migratory birds.

== See also ==
- List of reservoirs and dams in South Africa
- List of rivers of South Africa
