= Postage stamps and postal history of Stellaland Republic =

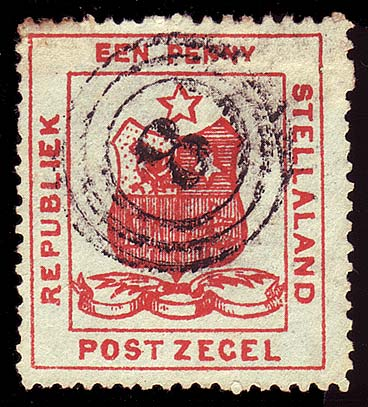
1-penny postage stamp depicting the coat of arms

Stellaland was a short-lived Boer republic from 1882 until 1885, located in southern Bechuanaland, west of the then South African Republic, with Vryburg as its capital. It was incorporated in British Bechuanaland in 1885. British Bechuanaland was subsequently incorporated into the Cape of Good Hope in 1895.

== First stamps ==
The Stellaland Republic issued five values of postage stamps in February 1884. They were crudely printed, using the coat of arms as design, and inscribed "REPUBLIEK / STELLALAND". Postally used copies are much rarer than unused copies.

== Overprints ==
Sometime in 1885, "TWEE" (Afrikaans for "two") was overprinted on a few of the 4-pence stamps, halving their values. These are quite rare, selling at auction for several thousand dollars when they appear. It is not clear whether they were official government issues, or privately produced, perhaps as political propaganda, since the use of stamps had recently become nearly universal worldwide.

== See also ==
- Postage stamps and postal history of British Bechuanaland
- Postage stamps and postal history of Bechuanaland Protectorate

== Sources ==
- Stanley Gibbons Ltd: various catalogues
- Encyclopaedia of Postal Authorities
- Rossiter, Stuart & John Flower. The Stamp Atlas. London: Macdonald, 1986. ISBN 0-356-10862-7
