= BSEU =

BSEU may refer to:

- Belarus State Economic University
- Botswana Saving Bank Employees' Union
