= State of Goshen =

Short-lived Boer Republic in southern Africa

Coordinates: 29°57′S 24°44′E

State of Goshen Het Land Goosen (Dutch)
- 1882–1883
- Flag
- Motto: Gewapend en Regtvaardig; English: Armed and Fair
- Location of Goshen in Southern Africa (1882–1883)
- Capital: Rooigrond, Mafikeng
- Common languages: Dutch; Tswana
- Religion: Dutch Reformed
- Government: Boer Republic
- President
  - Goshen: Nicolaas Claudius Gey van Pittius
- Legislature: Die Bestuur
- History
  - Founding of Goshen: 24 October 1882
  - Unified as United States of Stellaland: 1883
- Currency: South African pound (£)
Preceded by	Succeeded by
Tswana people; Griqua people	United States of Stellaland

Goshen, officially known as the State of Goshen (Dutch: Het Land Goosen), was a short-lived Boer republic in southern Africa founded by Boers expanding west from Transvaal who opposed British advances in the region.

Located in Tswana territory west of the Transvaal, Goshen existed as an independent nation for a short period; from 1882 to 1883 as the State of Goshen and, after unification with neighbouring Stellaland, as the United States of Stellaland (Dutch: Verenigde Staten van Stellaland) from 1883 to 1885.

During its history, Goshen, though small in size, became a focal point of conflict between the United Kingdom and the South African Republic, the two major players vying over the territory. After a series of claims and annexations, British fears of Boer expansionism ultimately led to its demise and, among other factors, set the stage for the Second Boer War of 1899–1902.

== History ==
Before the proclamation of Goshen, the land was under the control of competing Griqua and Tswana groups, while the United Kingdom laid claim to it as part of the emerging protectorate of British Bechuanaland. Two of the indigenous groups were under the leadership of chiefs Mankurwane and Montshiwa, whom the British regarded as "friendly," and another two under the leadership of chiefs Moshoette and Massouw.

In the mid-nineteenth century, Voortrekkers (Boer settlers) established themselves in the region and in the early 1880s they supported Moshoette in his battles against Mankurwane and Montshiwa, helping to besiege Montshiwa's stronghold Mahikeng. Mahikeng fell on 24 October 1882 and, in gratitude, Moshoette ceded large portions of Mankurwane's land (416 farms of 3,000 morgen (2,563 hectares) each) to the Boer mercenaries who had supported him.

The mercenaries, led by Nicolaas Claudius Gey van Pittius, immediately declared independence (followed by an official proclamation on 21 November 1882), naming the new nation after the Book of Genesis's Land of Goshen, "the best of the land of Egypt given to Joseph", with its capital at Rooigrond ("Red Ground").

== Geography ==
Goshen had the Molopo River as its northern border, and shared a border with the Transvaal. Goshen's capital Rooigrond was little more than a fortified farm consisting of a collection of mud huts and a population of a few dozen, situated near Mafeking.

Goshen's flag, designed by Gey van Pittius, was adopted in early 1883 and consisted of horizontal black, white and red stripes with a green vertical stripe at the hoist – imitating the Vierkleur but using the German flag as the basis as opposed to the Dutch.

== Unification with Stellaland ==
Less than a year after declaring independence, on 6 August 1883, Goshen and the neighbouring Republic of Stellaland united to form the United States of Stellaland.

While the British government was at first unconcerned about the declaration of independence of Goshen and Stellaland, and felt it could not prevent such proclamations of independence, Cecil Rhodes recognised the economic implications of an independent Boer republic blocking the transit of goods between the Cape Colony and British Central Africa and began to agitate the Cape Colony Government to forcibly take control of the area.

As part of his plan to bring the United States of Stellaland under British rule, Rhodes and colleague Frank Thompson travelled to Stellaland in September 1884 to convince the locals of the advantages of Cape rule. While the Stellaland residents were receptive to Rhodes, Goshenites proved to be far more hostile; while Rhodes stayed at the Goshen border, Thompson visited Rooigrond to speak to the President Gey van Pittius, who was living in a tent. Gey van Pittius immediately arrested Thompson before eventually releasing him to tell Rhodes that Goshen remained independent and demanded British recognition of that independence.

In response to Rhodes' actions, on 16 September 1884, Transvaal's President Paul Kruger proclaimed Transvaal's annexation of Goshen and Stellaland in "the interests of humanity" and on 3 October, Transvaal's Director of Education, the Rev Stephanus du Toit, arrived in Rooigrond, made a fiery speech, renamed the town "Heliopolis" and raised the Transvaal flag.

As a result, the British told Kruger that annexation was unacceptable and December 1884, the 4,000-strong Bechuanaland Expeditionary Force, led by General Charles Warren, were sent from England to quell the Boers and force Goshen and Stellaland to capitulate. Warren met no resistance and Goshen was subsequently incorporated into British Bechuanaland.

On 3 October 1895 the colony was abolished and incorporated into the Cape Colony.

== Sources ==
- Brownlie, I. & Burns, I. (1979) African Boundaries: A Legal and Diplomatic Encyclopaedia, C. Hurst & Co. Publishers: London. ISBN 0 9039 8387 7.
- Carr, H.G. (1961) Flags of the World, Frederick Warne and Co.: London.
- Galbraith, J. S. (1974) Crown and Charter: The Early Years of the British South Africa Company, University of California Press. ISBN 0 5200 2693 4.
- Giliomee, H. (2003) The Afrikaners: Biography of a People, C. Hurst & Co. Publishers: London. ISBN 1 8506 5714 9.
- Leyds, W.J. (1919) The Transvaal surrounded, T.F. Unwin Ltd.
- Mackenzie, J. (1959) Austral Africa; losing it or ruling it: Being incidents and experiences in Bechuanaland, Cape Colony, and England, Negro Universities Press: London.
- McCall, G. (1919) History of South Africa from 1873 to 1884, George Allen & Unwin Ltd.: London.
- Meredith, M. (2008) Diamonds, Gold and War, Pocket Books: London. ISBN 978 1 4165 2637 7.
- Rosenthal, E. (1970) Encyclopaedia of Southern Africa, Fifth Edition, Frederick Warne & Co. Ltd: London. ISBN 0 7232 1260 0.
- Sonnenburg, P. (2003) Colonialism. An International, Social, Cultural, and Political Encyclopedia, vol. 3, ABC-CLIO. ISBN 1 5760 7335 1.
- Stewart, J. (2006) African states and rulers, McFarland & Co.: Jefferson, N.C. ISBN 978 0 7864 2562 4.
- Walker, E.A. (1963) The Cambridge History of the British Empire, vol. 4., CUP Archive: Cambridge.
- Weaver, J.R.H., (1937) Dictionary of National Biography: [Fourth Supplement] 1922-1930, Oxford University Press: London.
- Webster, R. (2003) The Illustrated at the Fireside: True Southern African Stories, Spearhead: Claremont. ISBN 0-86486-558-9.
- Williams, B. (1921) Cecil Rhodes, Henry Holt & Company: New York.
