= BotswanaPost =

Postal service company in Botswana

- Type: Parastatal
- Industry: Communication
- Founded: 1989
- Headquarters: Gaborone, Botswana
- Key people: Nathan Kgabi, chairman Cornelius Ramatlhakwane, chief executive officer Leatile G. Moahi, chief human capital officer
- Services: Postal Services
- Website: www.botswanapost.co.bw

BotswanaPost is the company responsible for postal service in Botswana. It is a parastatal company, 100% owned by the Government of Botswana, under the Ministry of Transport and Communications.

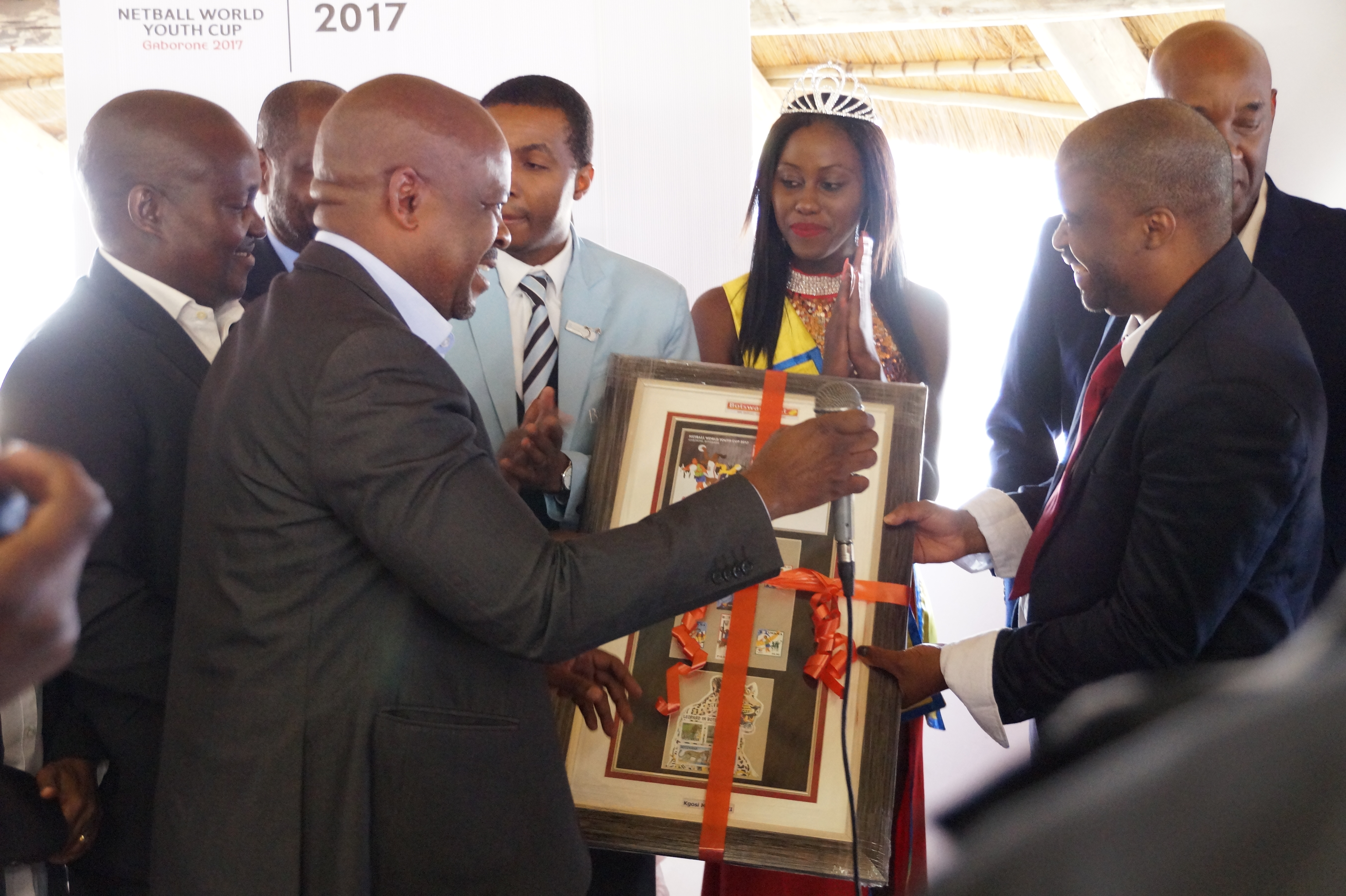
Unveiling of the new stamp by BotswanaPost CEO Ramatlhakwane.

== History ==
The postal service in Botswana dates back to 1875, when the London Missionary Society established the serve. Back then, pairs of "runners" carried mail between two points on a stretch from Bulawayo in present-day Zimbabwe, to Mafikeng, in present-day South Africa. Later, after the railway had been built, the train replaced the runners on foot. In the late 1990s the Botswana postal department acquired its own fleet of vehicles to carry mail and parcels. The postal department that the missionaries established in the late 19th century evolved into the Bechuanaland Protectorate Postal Services. At Botswana's independence in 1966, it was rebranded into the Department of Posts and Telegraphs. At that time the services offered included the Post Office Savings Bank.

In 1980, the Botswana Telecommunications Corporation was spun off as an independent parastatal. Two years later, Botswana Savings Bank was also spun off as an independent institution. Finally, BotswanaPost became a separate entity in 1989. Botswana Savings Bank has an agreement with BotswanaPost, to offer banking services through the nearly one hundred and twenty (120) postal outlets throughout Botswana. Emerging technologies such as Email and internet services and later cellular phones, all followed, reducing the use of letter as a preferred mode of communication.

The Post is now looking at harnessing Information and Communication Technologies (ICT) to stimulate communication particularly in the rural areas as well as business growth on other products like parcel mail and money transfer, which are driven by electronic capabilities.

== Appointed Chief Executive Officer of BotswanaPost 2017 ==
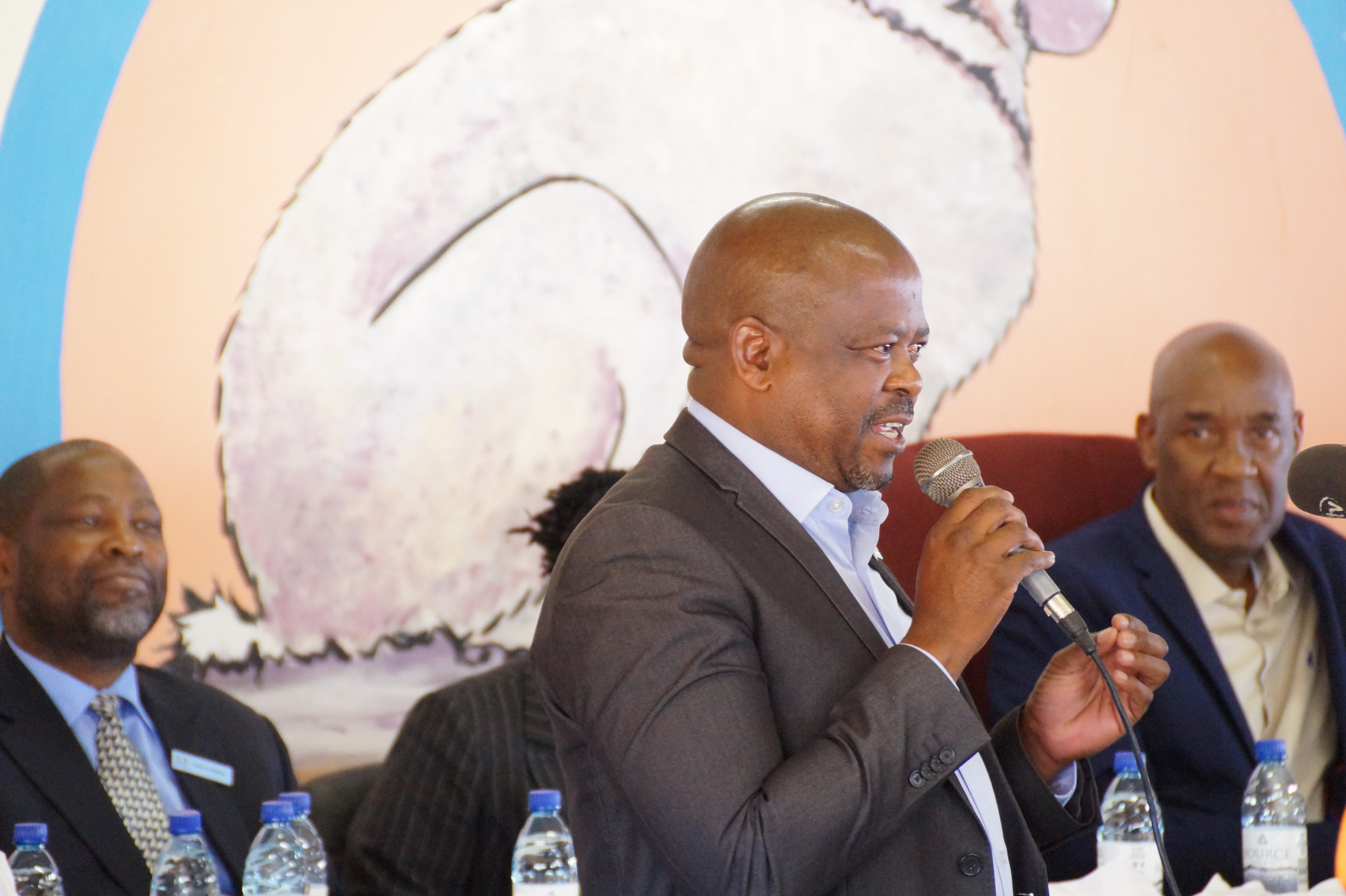
Cornelius Ramatlhakwane (CEO BotswanaPost), speaking at the Kgotla meeting in Masunga for the World Telecommunications and Information Society day 2017

Mr Cornelius Ramatlhakwana is the newly appointed CEO of BotswanaPost succeeding Pele Moleta after his abrupt resignation in March. The appointment of Ramatlhakwane, who was the Head of Business Development within BotswanaPost, was made public by the Board. BotswanaPost Head of Strategy and Communications, Lebogang Bok confirmed Ramatlhakwane's appointment with a short statement.

It is not clear what will happen to the current acting Chief Executive, Setshedi Botlhole-Mmopi who was appointed shortly after the abrupt departure of Moleta who now works as Chief Operations Officer for Barclays Bank Botswana. Following the departure of Moleta, the board appointed Botlhole-Mmopi as Acting Chief Executive. Moleta together with former Chief Financial Officer (CFO), Kutlwano Mswela resigned from Poso House under unclear circumstances.

During his tenure at BotswanaPost, Moleta was given the name "The Post Man" which he accepted with pride and enthusiasm. BotswanaPost recorded massive losses over the years, but that misfortune seemed to motivate him to relentlessly sell his vision of charting the organization into profitability, which he made sure drummed far louder than the Post Office's hardships.

Before his departure, Moleta pinned the future of BotswanaPost on technology and innovation. He introduced, among others Poso Cloud, which sought to bridge the digital divide by offering public Wi-Fi hotspots. He leveraged on the Post Office's national footprint to forge easy access payment agreements with other organisations like cell phone network providers, power and water utilities as well as roads department. All these fell under the portfolio of Ramatlhakwane, who was then Business Development Manager. It was perhaps his previous role, on which the future of BotswanaPost was underpinned, that set him as the best man to take the Post Office forward.

== Philatelic Museum ==
Botswana Post have established a small philatelic museum in their headquarters in Gaborone.

== See also ==
- Postage stamps and postal history of Botswana
- Botswana Postal Services Workers' Union
- Botswana Savings Bank
