= Setumo Dam =

- Interactive map of Setumo Dam
- Official name: Setumo Dam
- Location: North West, South Africa
- Coordinates: 25°51′30″S 25°30′1″E
- Opening date: 1997
- Operators: Department of Water Affairs and Forestry

Dam and spillways
- Type of dam: earth-fill
- Impounds: Molopo River
- Height: 19 metres (62 ft)
- Length: 1,600 metres (5,200 ft)

Reservoir
- Creates: Setumo Dam Reservoir
- Total capacity: 19,600,000 cubic metres (690,000,000 cu ft)
- Surface area: 447.3 hectares (1,105 acres)

Setumo Dam is an earth-fill type dam located on the Molopo River near Mmabatho, North West, South Africa. It was established in 1997 and serves mainly for water storage/regulation purposes. The hazard potential of the dam has been ranked significant.

== See also ==
- List of reservoirs and dams in South Africa
- List of rivers of South Africa
