= Postage stamps and postal history of Botswana =

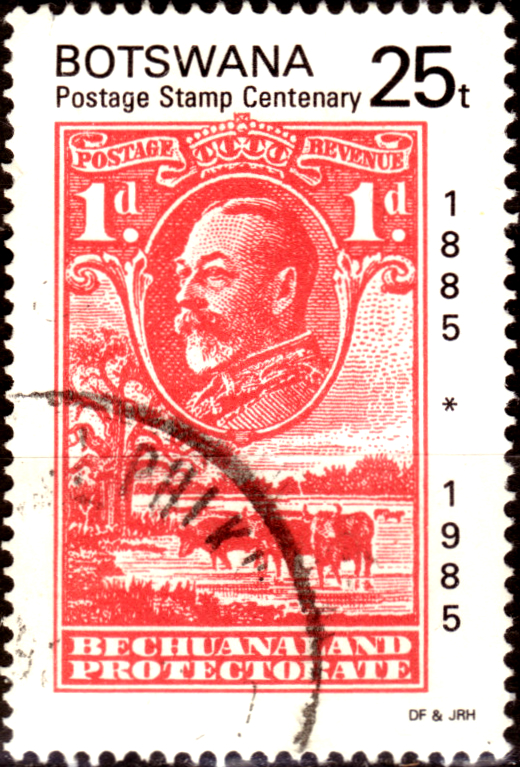
A used 1985 stamp for the centenary of the first Bechuanaland stamps, depicting a George V stamp for the Bechuanaland Protectorate

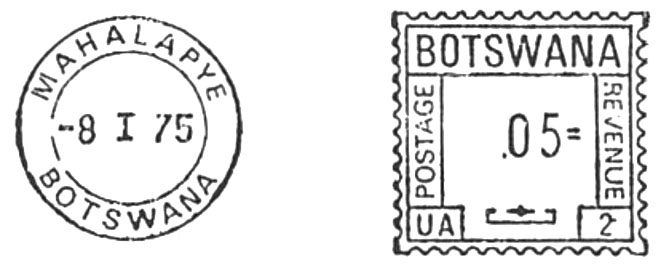
A 1975 meter stamp from Botswana

Botswana has produced postage stamps for national use since becoming independent on 30 September 1966. The country formerly used the stamps of the Bechuanaland Protectorate. The first independence issue of 1966 included depictions of an abattoir in Lobatse, Botswana National Airways and the State House in Gaborone.

== Philatelic Museum ==
Botswana Post have established a small philatelic museum in their headquarters in Gaborone.

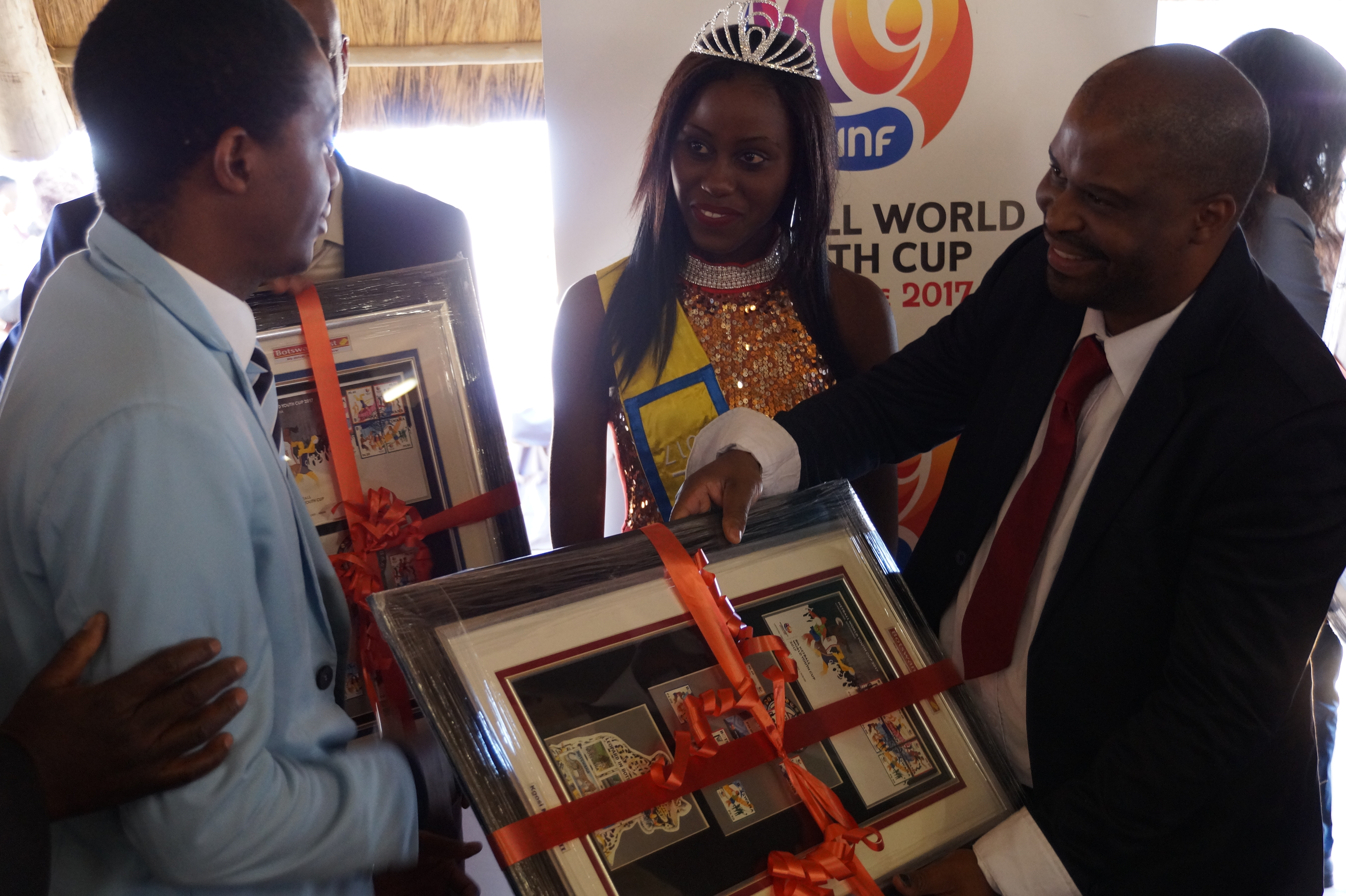
Botswana Post new stamp unveiling 2017, in the picture (Kgosi Maruje III)

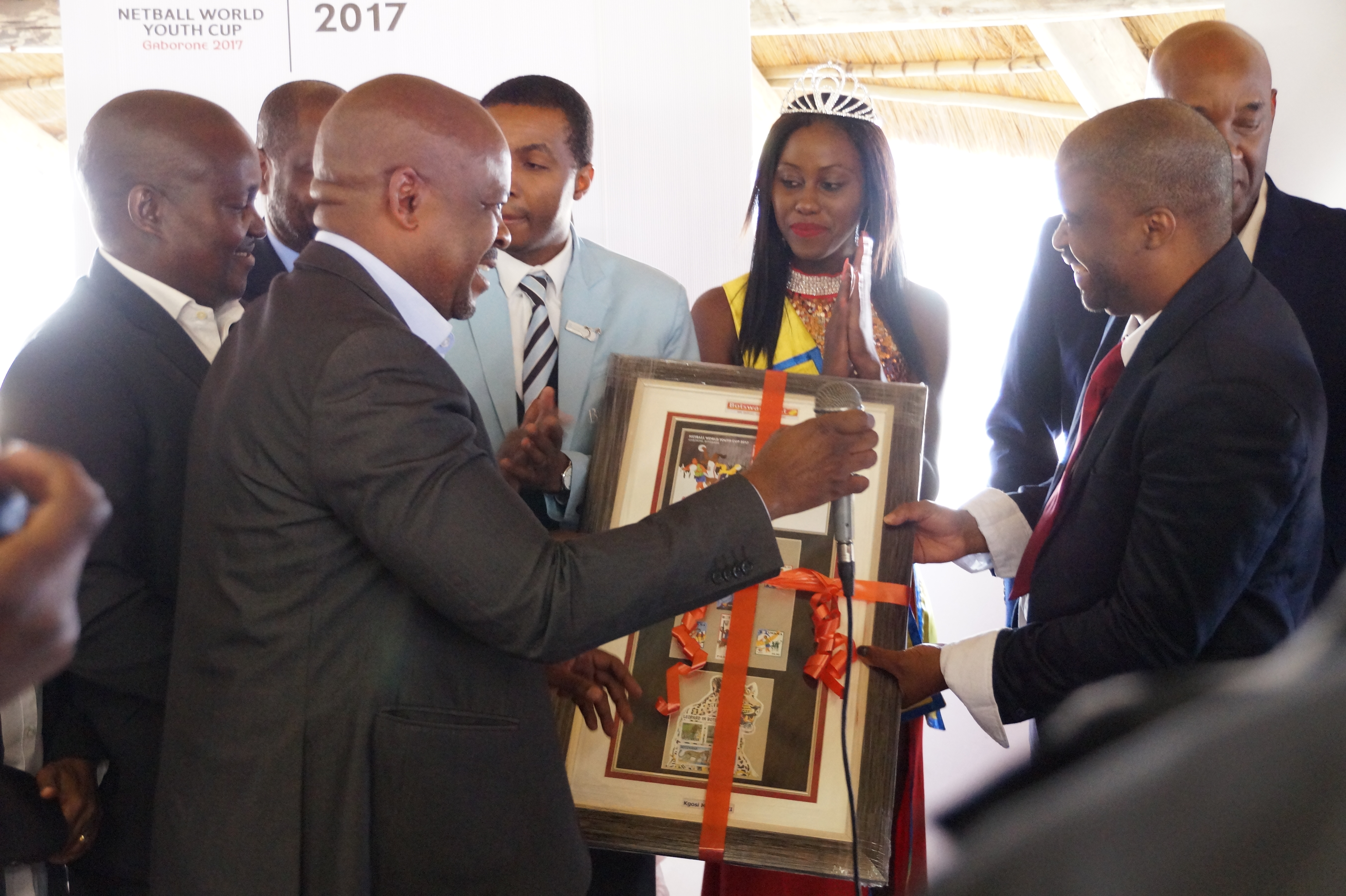
Botswana Post new stamp Unveiling 2017, Botswana post ceo Ramatlhakwana

== See also ==
- Postage stamps and postal history of Bechuanaland Protectorate
