= Mahikeng Airport =

Mahikeng Airport Mmabatho Airport
- IATA: MBD; ICAO: FAMM

Summary
- Airport type: Public
- Operator: Government
- Serves: Mahikeng, South Africa
- Location: Mmabatho
- Elevation AMSL: 4,181 ft (1,274 m)
- Coordinates: 25°48′27″S 025°32′40″E

Map
- Location of airport in North West province Location of North West in South Africa

Runways
Direction	Length		Surface
Direction	m	ft	Surface
04/22	4,499	14,760	Asphalt
- Sources: South African AIP, DAFIF

Mahikeng Airport or Mmabatho Airport (IATA: MBD, ICAO: FAMM) is an airport serving Mahikeng and Mmabatho, the current and former capital cities of the North West province in South Africa. The airport is widely known as Mafikeng Airport after Mahikeng's former name. The airport is managed by the North West Province Department of Transport and Roads. The airport is a former air force base of the Boputhatswana Defence Force and was previously classified as an international airport. As of 2014, discussions and construction was in progress in order for the airport to regain its status as an international airport.

== History ==
In the early 1980s, Mmabatho was developed to serve as the capital city of Bophuthatswana. Developed as one of the bantustan's premier projects, Mahikeng Airport costed approximately R25 million to build. Construction was completed in May 1984, and President Lucas Mangope officially opened it as Mmabatho International Airport in June 1984. The new airport replaced the earlier Mafikeng Aerodrome, which was located in the city centre.

The airport is home to a flying club called the Mafikeng Flying Club. The club was formed in 1971. The air base was taken over and used as a base by members of the Afrikaner Weerstandsbeweging during the Bophuthatswana coup d'état of 1994.

The airport's international license was suspended by the South African Civil Aviation Authority on 16 April 2001 with immediate effect due to issues with security, fire and airport management.

The airport is used by private aircraft operators as passenger flights stopped in 2009 due to the airport failing to comply with various regulations. Scheduled commercial flights by South African Express resumed in 2015 and were suspended in June 2018.

== Facilities ==
The airport resides at an elevation of 4,181 feet (1,274 m) above mean sea level. It has one runway designated 04/22 with an asphalt surface measuring 4,499 by 45 metres (14,760 ft × 148 ft) as well as asphalt taxiways.

As of 2014, the airport is undergoing an expansion that includes re-marking runways and taxiways as well as installing a new instrument landing system that should allow Mahikeng airport to regain its international status. The cost of the expansion project was R15 million with a further R30 million being spent in order to ensure the project is completed within 2014. The expansion is intended to make Mahikeng airport a major cargo hub in the North West province that can be used to export various agricultural products produced within the province. Mahikeng airport has all the necessary facilities for customs control. The airport does not have international certification, however these facilities can be made operational again if needed.

== Airlines and destinations ==
Since South African Express terminated their flights to Johannesburg–O. R. Tambo, the airport no longer supports scheduled routes.

== See also ==
- List of longest runways
- List of airports in South Africa
