= Botswana Savings Bank =

Development bank in Botswana

- Type: State owned company
- Industry: Banking
- Founded: 1992
- Headquarters: Gaborone, Botswana
- Owner: Government of Botswana
- Website: www.bsb.bw

Botswana Savings Bank BSB is a financial services organization in Botswana. It is licensed as a development bank by the Bank of Botswana, the national banking regulator.

== Overview ==
BSB is a government-owned financial services organisation that mobilizes domestic savings by accepting customer deposits, grants loans on commercial terms and offers other financial services as it considers necessary to meet the needs of the people of Botswana. Established in 1992 by act of parliament, the bank offers savings accounts, mortgage loans, automobile loans and other secured loans to its customers. The Bank is a member of the World Savings Banks Institute. According to the Bank of Botswana, Botswana Savings Bank had an asset base of approximately US$73 million (BWP:480 million) as of December 2009.

== Branches ==
The bank maintains two (2) branches; one in Gaborone and another in Francistown. In addition, BSB has a partnership agreement with BotswanaPost to offer banking services through over 120 postal outlets throughout the country.

== See also ==
- BotswanaPost
- Botswana Saving Bank Employees' Union
- List of Botswana banks in Africa
- List of banks in Botswana
- Savings bank
