= British Bechuanaland =

1885–1895 British colony in Southern Africa

- 1885–1895
- Flag Coat of arms
- Anthem: God Save the Queen
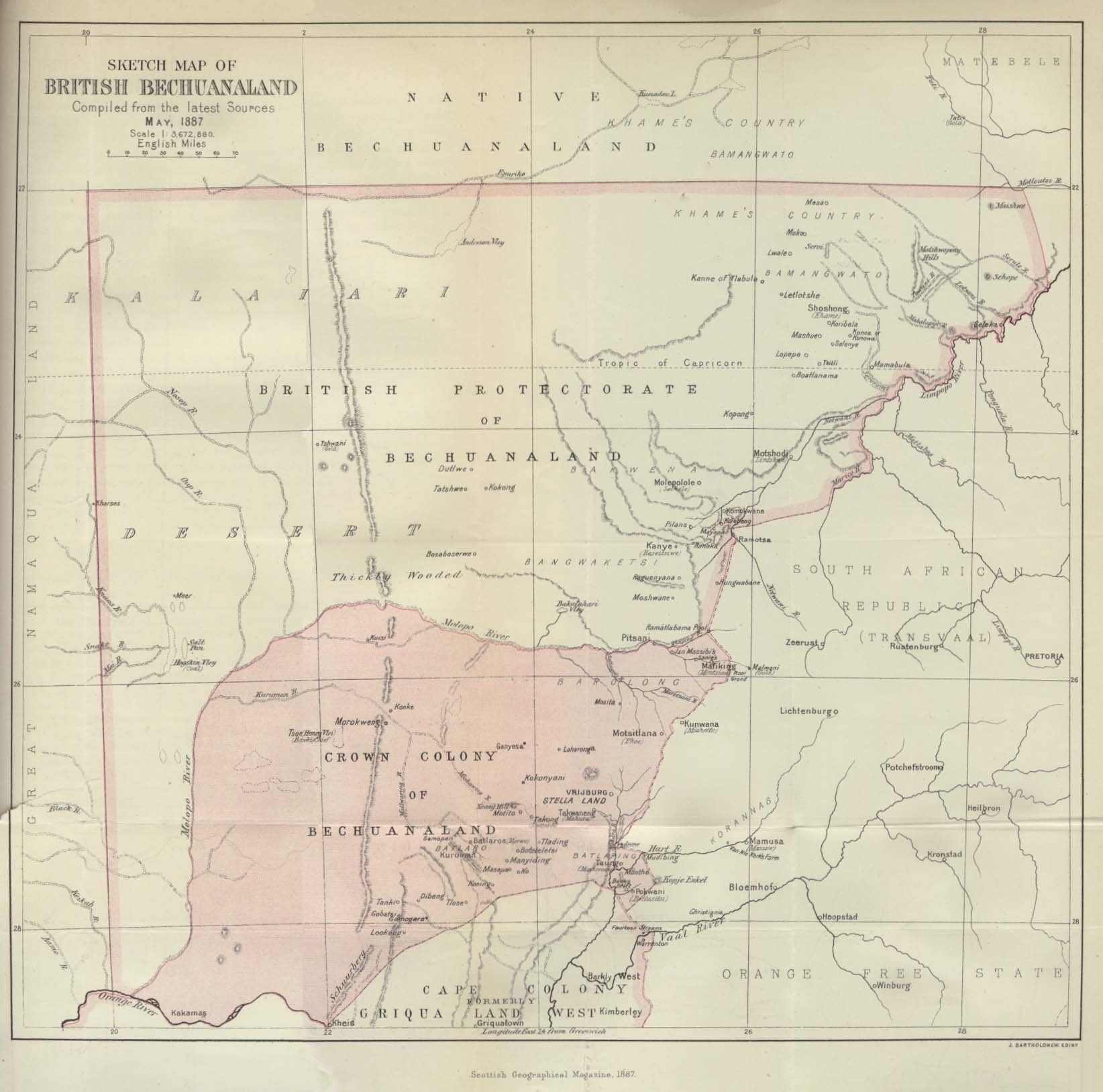
- Status: Crown Colony
- Capital: Vryburg
- Common languages: English
- Government: Constitutional monarchy
- Queen
  - 1885–95: Queen Victoria
- Historical era: New Imperialism
  - Crown colony established: 30 September 1885
  - Annexation to Cape Colony: 16 November 1895
Preceded by	Succeeded by
Tswana people; Stellaland	Cape Colony

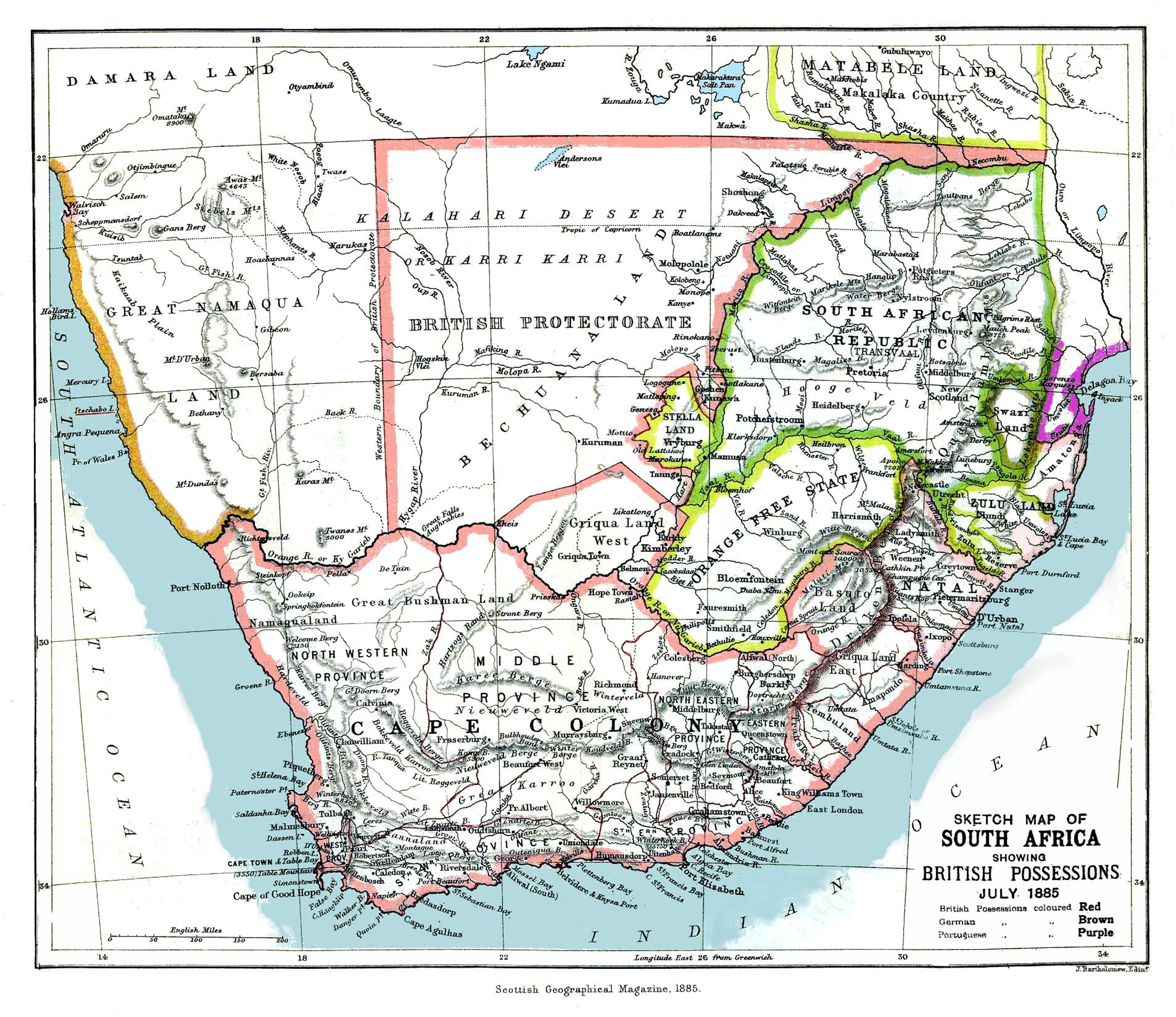
An 1885 map showing the Bechuanaland Protectorate prior to the creation of the Crown colony of British Bechuanaland and the Heligoland–Zanzibar Treaty.

British Bechuanaland was a short-lived Crown colony of the United Kingdom that existed in southern Africa from its formation on 30 September 1885 until its annexation to the neighbouring Cape Colony on 16 November 1895. British Bechuanaland had an area of 51,424 square miles (133,190 km^{2}) and a population of 84,210. Today the region forms part of South Africa.

== History ==
Bechuanaland meant "the country of the Tswana", and for administrative purposes was divided into two political entities by the Molopo River. The northern part was administered as the Bechuanaland Protectorate, and the southern part was administered as the Crown colony of British Bechuanaland.

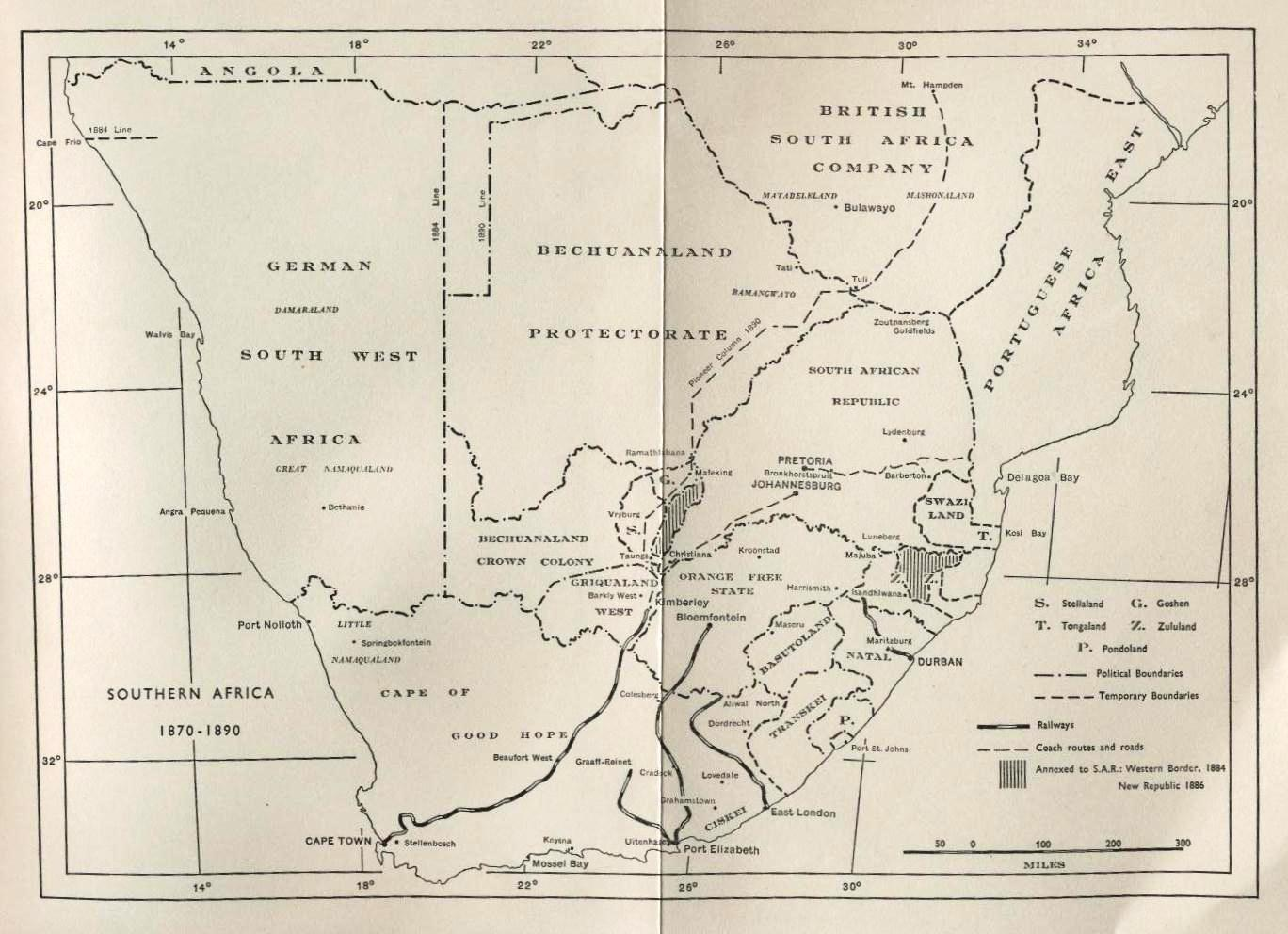
A map showing political boundaries in Southern Africa in the late 19th century including British Bechuanaland ("Crown Colony") and the larger Bechuanaland Protectorate to the north

In 1882, the Tswana country suffered two secessions by the Boer states of Stellaland and Goshen. For many months, starting in 1883, pressure was placed on the British Government to take action in Bechuanaland because of unrest in the area. On 29 October 1884, the British Government appointed Sir Charles Warren as Special Commissioner of Bechuanaland. On 13 November 1884, Parliament voted a sum of £675,000 (this is equivalent to over £32 million today) for military operations in Bechuanaland. Sir Charles Warren was authorised to recruit an irregular force of 1,500 in South Africa in addition to the regular troops that would be provided.

A force of 4,000 troops, under Sir Charles Warren, set off to recapture Stellaland and Goshen. On 7 February 1885 the force reached Vryburg, the principal town in Stellaland, then continued to the hamlet of Rooigrond, the administrative centre of Goshen. Just north of Rooigrond the town of Mafeking was laid out as an administrative centre. By 8 April 1885, Sir Charles Warren sent a dispatch to notify the British Government that he had occupied Bechuanaland and had entirely restored order. The two Boer republics had collapsed without any bloodshed.

On 30 September 1885, Stellaland, Goshen and other territories to the south of the Molopo and Nossob rivers (excluding Griqualand West) were constituted as the Crown Colony of British Bechuanaland. In 1891, the South African Customs Union was extended to British Bechuanaland, and, in 1895, the colony was annexed to the Cape Colony and now forms part of South Africa, the area around Mafikeng.

== Postal and revenue stamps ==
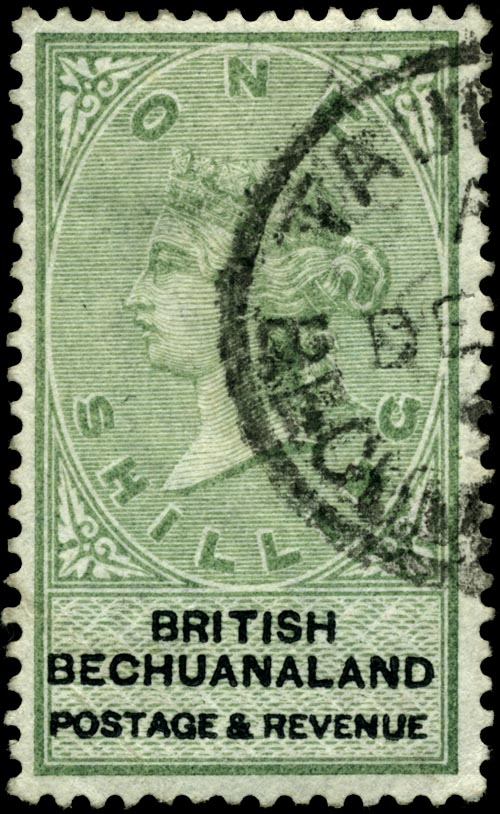

== See also ==
- History of South Africa
- List of commissioners of Bechuanaland
- Bechuanaland Protectorate, the northern part of Bechuanaland that now forms the Republic of Botswana.
- Postage stamps and postal history of British Bechuanaland
