= List of South African provincial capitals =

The following is a list of the capitals of the provinces of South Africa.

Province	Capital	Coordinates
Eastern Cape	Bhisho	32°51′12″S 27°26′10″E
Free State	Bloemfontein	29°06′58″S 26°12′51″E
Gauteng	Johannesburg	26°12′22″S 28°02′24″E
KwaZulu-Natal	Pietermaritzburg	29°36′05″S 30°22′56″E
Limpopo	Polokwane	23°54′45″S 29°27′21″E
Mpumalanga	Mbombela	25°26′15″S 30°58′19″E
North West	Mahikeng	25°50′03″S 25°36′42″E
Northern Cape	Kimberley	28°44′10″S 24°46′08″E
Western Cape	Cape Town	33°55′27″S 18°25′07″E
