= Botswana Postal Services Workers' Union =

Trade union in Botswana

BOPSWU
- Botswana Postal Services Workers' Union
- Headquarters: Gaborone, Botswana
- Location: Botswana
- Key people: Modise Moopi, general secretary
- Affiliations: BFTU

The Botswana Postal Services Workers' Union (BOPSWU) is a trade union affiliate of the Botswana Federation of Trade Unions in Botswana representing workers at BotswanaPost.
