= Botswana Saving Bank Employees' Union =

Trade union in Botswana

BSEU
- Botswana Saving Bank Employees' Union
- Headquarters: Gaborone, Botswana
- Location: Botswana
- Key people: Samon Moraloki, general secretary
- Affiliations: BFTU

The Botswana Saving Bank Employees' Union (BSEU) is a trade union representing the staff at Botswana Savings Bank. It is an affiliate of the Botswana Federation of Trade Unions in Botswana.
