= Stellaland =

1880s republic in Southern Africa

Coordinates: 26.95°S 24.73°E

Republic of Stellaland (1882–1883) Republiek Stellaland United States of Stellaland (1883–1885) Verenigde Staten van Stellaland
- 1882–1885
- State (top) and civil (bottom) flags Coat of arms
- Motto: Gewapend en Regtvaardig; Dutch: Armed and just(ified)
- Location of Stellaland in Southern Africa (1882–1885)
- Status: Boer Republic; ZAR protectorate (1884)
- Capital: Vrijburg (Vryburg)
- Common languages: Dutch; Tswana
- Religion: Dutch Reformed; Dutch Reformed dissenters Badimo
- Administrator
  - Stellaland: Gerrit Jacobus van Niekerk
  - Goshen (1882–1883): Nicolaas Claudius Gey van Pittius
- Legislature: Die Bestuur
- History
  - Founding of Stellaland: 26 July 1882
  - Founding of Goshen: October 1882
  - Unification: 1883
  - Annexation (ZAR): 10 September 1884
  - Invasion (British): December 1884
  - Abolished: August 1885

Area
- Stellaland: 15,500 km^{2} (6,000 sq mi)
- Goshen: 10,400 km^{2} (4,000 sq mi)

Population
  - Stellaland: 20,500
  - Goshen: 17,000
- Currency: South African pound (£)
Preceded by	Succeeded by
Tswana people; Griqua people	British Bechuanaland
- Today part of: South Africa

The Republic of Stellaland (Dutch: Republiek Stellaland) was a Boer republic located in an area of British Bechuanaland (now in South Africa's North West Province), west of the Transvaal. It served as a Boer republic from 1882 to 1883. After unification with the neighbouring State of Goshen, it became the United States of Stellaland (Dutch: Verenigde Staten van Stellaland) from 1883 until 1885, when it was abolished and annexed by the British.

During its short history, the small state became a focal point for conflict between the United Kingdom and the South African Republic, the two major players vying for control of the territory. After a series of claims and annexations, British fears of Boer expansionism led to its demise and, among other factors, set the stage for the Second Boer War.

== Background ==
Before the proclamation of the republic, the area was under the control of competing Korana and Tswana groups, while the United Kingdom laid claim to it as a part of the emerging protectorate of British Bechuanaland. Two of the indigenous groups were under the leadership of chiefs Mankoroane and Montšioa, whom the British regarded as "friendly", and two others under the leadership of chiefs Moshette (a Motswana) and Massouw (a Korana). When a feud erupted between Mankoroane and another chief, each side resorted to recruiting volunteers, promising them land in return for their assistance. After a settlement was negotiated with mediation from the Transvaal Republic, large portions of Mankoroane's land with 416 farms of 3,000 morgen (2,563 ha) each were given to Boer mercenaries who had fought on his adversary's side, and the new inhabitants decided to declare independence.

== Unification ==
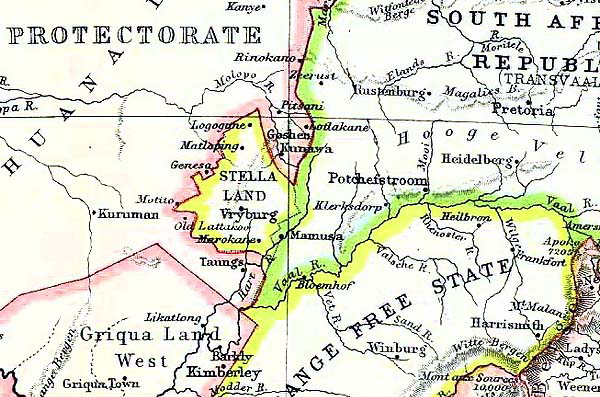
Stellaland with its capital Vryburg on a contemporary map prior to unification with Goshen to the northeast

The Republic of Stellaland was created on 26 July 1882, under the leadership of its elected president Gerrit Jacobus van Niekerk, a farmer from Transvaal, and was given the name Stellaland (Star Land) in reference to a comet that was visible in the skies at the time. The town of Vryburg was founded and declared its capital. At its founding, the new country covered an area of 15,500 km^{2} (5,985 sq mi) and was home to an estimated population of 20,500 individuals, 3,000 of whom were of European ancestry.

The State of Goshen, named after the biblical Land of Goshen, was founded by Nicolaas Claudius Gey van Pittius in October 1882 in the neighbouring area called Rooigrond with the approval of chief Moshette. Goshen had an estimated population of 17,000, of whom approximately 2,000 were of European origin, and covered an area of 10,400 km^{2} (4,015 sq mi).

In 1883, Stellaland merged with Goshen to form the United States of Stellaland.

== Status ==
Whether or not the independence of any of these states was ever recognised by another country is not clear. In Stellaland's favour, one can point out that the Montevideo convention which formalised the definition of sovereignty in the modern sense would not be signed until 1933, and that the local chiefs approved its existence. On the other hand, several British sources refer to Van Niekerk and his followers as "freebooters" and "marauders". A telegram erroneously sent by Sir Charles Warren, military commander for British Bechuanaland, to Van Niekerk endorsed Cecil Rhodes' settlement in Stellaland. Only later did Warren realise that his wording could be interpreted as an implicit acknowledgement of Stellaland's legality, and he denied that the message had such implications. In February 1884, Great Britain unilaterally declared the area a British protectorate.

Stellaland's laws and constitution were practically identical to those of the South African Republic. It never issued an independent currency, but instead—like all the surrounding states—used the South African pound; it did, however, print its own postage stamps beginning in February 1884 which are still traded among collectors to the present day.

== Annexation ==
Because Van Niekerk's government had announced its intention to levy taxes on all trade going through its territory, Cecil Rhodes, founder of the De Beers diamond company, and the British administration feared a setback for their endeavours in the mining business, because Stellaland lay on one of the main trade routes. It was also presumed that the small country could eventually be incorporated into the neighbouring South African Republic in an effort to circumvent the Pretoria Convention of 1881 which called for an end to Boer expansionism.

Rhodes even asserted that the area was of such a crucial nature to the Crown that if the territory held by Stellaland remained under Boer control, British presence "should fall from the position of a paramount state in South Africa to that of a minor state." These fears were fuelled when, on 10 September 1884, President Paul Kruger of Transvaal declared the area to be under the protection of the South African Republic and annexed it six days later. In December 1884 the British sent in a force under Sir Charles Warren, who invaded the country and abolished the republic in August of the following year before it was incorporated into British Bechuanaland.

== See also ==
- Postage stamps and postal history of Stellaland Republic
- Flag of Stellaland
- Coat of arms of Stellaland
