= Mmabatho =

- Location within North West (South African province) Location within South Africa Location within Africa
- Coordinates: 25°51′S 25°38′E
- Country: South Africa
- Province: North West
- District: Ngaka Modiri Molema
- Municipality: Mahikeng

Area
  - Total: 18.47 km^{2} (7.13 sq mi)

Population (2011)
  - Total: 38,297
  - Density: 2,073/km^{2} (5,370/sq mi)

Racial makeup (2011)
  - Black African: 95.9%
  - Coloured: 2.0%
  - Indian/Asian: 1.0%
  - White: 1.0%
  - Other: 0.1%

First languages (2011)
  - Tswana: 89.6%
  - English: 1%
  - Sotho: 3.6%
  - Xhosa: 2.8%
  - Other: 2%
- Time zone: UTC+2 (SAST)
- Postal code (street): 2735
- PO box: 2790
- Area code: 018

Mmabatho (Tswana for "Mother of the People") is the former capital of the North-West Province of South Africa. During the apartheid era, it was the capital of the former "Bantustan" of Bophuthatswana, separated from the adjacent Mafeking or Mafikeng, which temporarily remained outside Bophuthatswana. The town of Mafikeng merged with Mmabatho in 1980 and was treated as a suburb of Mmabatho between 1980 and 1994.

== History ==
Following the end of apartheid in 1994, Bophuthatswana was integrated into the newly established North-West Province and Mmabatho was proclaimed the provincial capital. However, Mmabatho's status as the provincial capital was short-lived. Later in 1994, the North West provincial legislature voted to rename the capital as Mahikeng, reducing Mmabatho to being a suburb of Mafikeng. The city is an enclave within the latter.

== Mmabatho today ==
Mmabatho contains many provincial government buildings, a shopping complex called Mega City and a Sports Stadium formerly called the Independence Stadium. The North-West University's Mahikeng campus, formerly the University of Bophuthatswana, is located in Mmabatho.

Situated just south of the Botswana border, the town is connected by main roads to South Africa's national capital of Pretoria in the east and to Gaborone, the capital of Botswana, in the north. A railway runs north and south from the neighbouring town of Mafikeng. The city is served by Mmabatho International Airport, although there are no longer any scheduled flights to/from the airport.
