= Mafikeng =

Capital city of the North-West Province, South Africa

Mafikeng Mafeking
- Provincial Capital
- Mahikeng
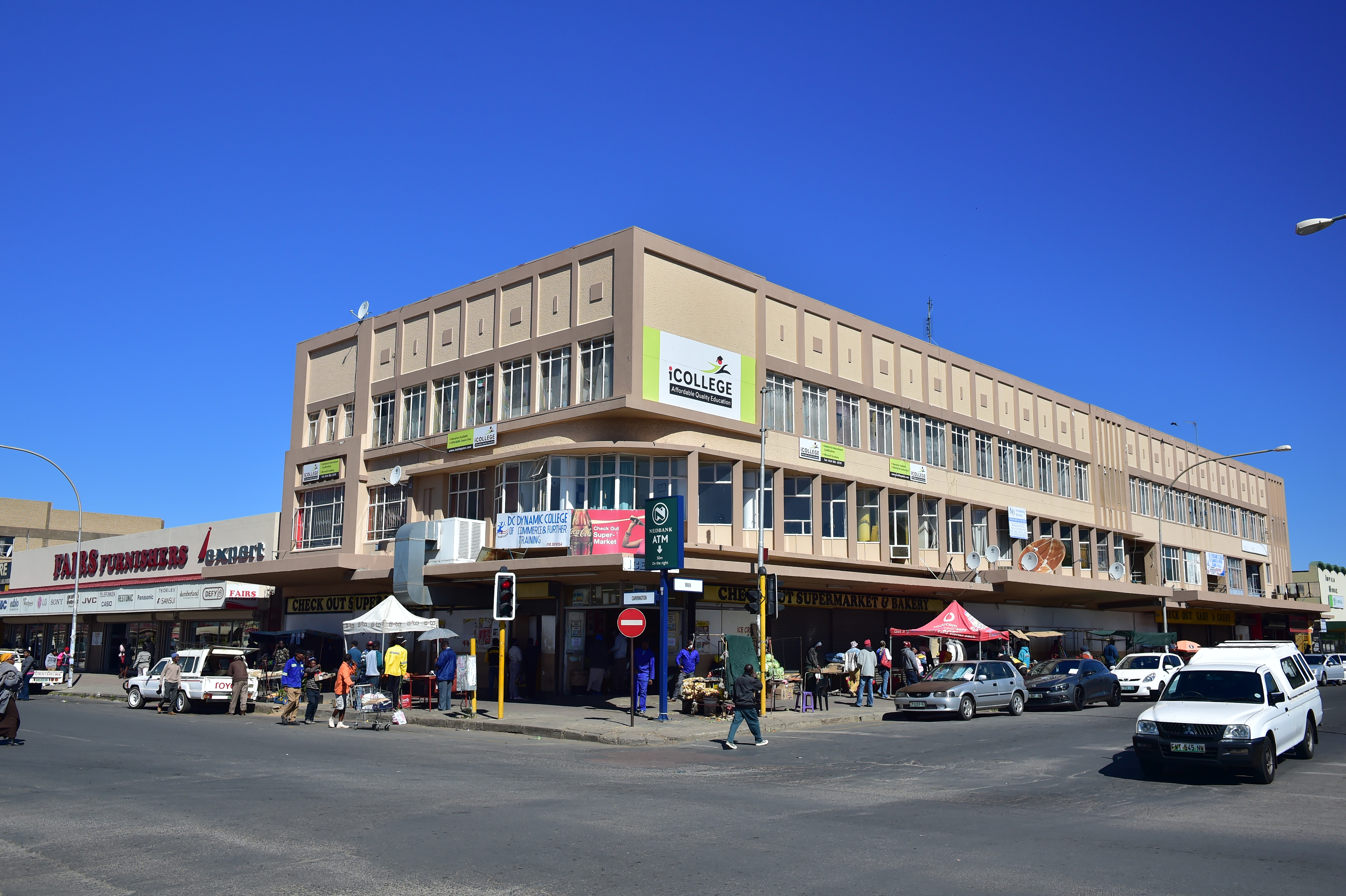
- Streetview of Mahikeng

- Location within North West (South African province) Location within South Africa Location within Africa
- Coordinates: 25°51′56″S 25°38′37″E
- Country: South Africa
- Province: North West
- District: Ngaka Modiri Molema
- Municipality: Mahikeng
- Established: 1852

Area
  - Total: 24.57 km^{2} (9.49 sq mi)
- Elevation: 1,500.0 m (4,921.3 ft)

Population (2011)
  - Total: 291 527
  - Density: 11.8/km^{2} (30.7/sq mi)

Racial makeup (2011)
  - Black African: 95.5%
  - Coloured: 2.3%
  - White: 1.3%
  - Indian/Asian: 0.8%
  - Other: 0.8%

First languages (2011)
  - Tswana: 78.4%
  - Sesotho: 3.0%
  - Afrikaans: 1.1%
  - English: 0.6%
  - Other: 11.1%
- Time zone: UTC+2 (SAST)
- Postal code (street): 2745
- PO box: 2745
- Website: www.mahikeng.gov.za

Mafikeng (Tswana for "Place of Rocks"), officially known as Mahikeng and alternatively known as Mafeking (/ˈmæfəkɪŋ/, US also /ˈmɑːf-/), is the capital city of the North West province of South Africa. It was also the capital of the Bechuanaland Protectorate (modern Botswana) until 1965, despite being located outside the protectorate.

Close to South Africa's border with Botswana, Mafikeng is 1,400 km (870 mi) northeast of Cape Town and 260 km (160 mi) west of Johannesburg. In 2001 it had a population of 49,300. In 2007 Mafikeng was reported to have a population of 250,000, of which the CBD constituted between 69,000 and 75,000. It is built on the open veld at an elevation of 1,500 m (4,921 ft), by the banks of the Upper Molopo River. The Madibi goldfields are some 15 kilometres (9 1/2 miles) south of the town.

== Name ==
The name Mahikeng means "the place of rocks" in the classic Setswana language of the people of the North West province of South Africa and the neighbouring country of Botswana. However, the city is commonly pronounced as Mafikeng, in the vernacular of the Batswana people of Mmabatho. Historically it was also known as Mafeking, and is still referred to as such historiographically in the context of the Siege of Mafeking and Relief of Mafeking during the Boer War.

In February 2010, Lulu Xingwana, the Minister of Arts and Culture, approved the town's name to be changed again to Mahikeng. Despite this, the town's ANC-run local government and most local residents still refer to the town as Mafikeng, both informally and formally.

Mahikeng literally means "place among rocks". It refers to volcanic rocks that provided temporary shelter for Stone Age humans in order to more easily hunt animals drinking water in the Molopo River.

== History ==
=== Establishment ===
Molema's town was founded by Molema Tawana (c. 1822 – January 1882).

In 1857 Molema led an advance guard to scout out the area along the Molopo River. This was a familiar area as they had previously lived in nearby Khunwana. Molema settled a town known in its early years as "Molema's town", while the main body of the Barolong under Montshiwa followed. But Montshiwa did not feel safe at Mafikeng due to the close presence and encroachment of the Boers in the Transvaal. He led his followers to Moshaneng in the territory of the Bangwaketse in present-day Botswana.

Molema remained at Mafikeng to ensure that the Barolong retained a presence there. Several of Montshiwa's other brothers were also stationed at crucial sites in the proximity of the Molopo. Molema had to use all his diplomatic skills on several occasions to prevent Boer incursion and settlement near Mafikeng. He has been described as a man of "strong personality and exceptional gifts...and Montshiwa's chief counsellor in vital matters". (S.M Molema: 35) After negotiations with Molema, Montshiwa decided to return to Mafikeng in 1876.

Molema was a firm believer in Western education, having attended Healdtown; he opened a school for the Barolong once they had settled in the district. Molema became a farmer and businessman, as well as advising his brother Montshiwa. He died in 1882. One of his sons, Silas Molema, became a doctor and historian of the Barolong. Later British settlers spelled the name as "Mafeking". The Jameson Raid started from Pitsani Pothlugo (or Potlogo) 39 kilometres (24 miles) north of Mafeking on December 29, 1895.

For most of the 19th century, Mafeking appeared on Southern African maps as a part of Bechuanaland, a territory consisting of Tswana tribal territories, stretching from the Bangwato of Khama in present-day Botswana to the Batlhaping in present-day South Africa's Northern Cape and North West provinces.

Bechuanaland was ruled by Paramount Chiefs of the Tswana groups such as the Barolong, Bakwena, Bangwaketse, Bahurutshe, Batlhaping and the Bangwato who under Sekgoma I and Khama III stretched Tswana lands further north to close to present day Zimbabwe and Zambia territories.

The Tswana chieftains had ruled Bechuanaland on the advice of Congregational missionaries of the London Missionary Society, including Robert Moffat who was stationed at Kuruman among the Batlhaping and David Livingstone who was based among Sechele's Bakwena at Kolobeng close to present day Gaborone, Botswana; the Methodist missionaries of the Wesleyan Missionary Society among the Barolong; and the Lutheran Hermannsburg Missionary Society among the Bakwena ba ga Mogopa.

In 1852, the Boers of the Transvaal invaded Bechuanaland but were defeated by a Tswana army led by Sechele I (Setshele) of the Bakwena ba ga Sechele at Dimawe in present-day Botswana during the Battle of Dimawe of 1852.

The Boers of the Transvaal would successfully invade Bechuanaland 30 years later in 1882 establishing the Republic of Stellaland and State of Goshen around present day Vryburg and surrounding areas in 1882 to 1883. Stellaland and Goshen unified as the United States of Stellaland in 1883 to 1885.

In response, British Congregational missionary John MacKenzie of the London Missionary Society stationed among the Bangwato at Shoshong advised Tswana Paramount Chiefs to seek British protection.

This led to the Warren expedition of December 1884 to mid 1885, when the British sent 4000 troops from the Cape Colony led by Major General Charles Warren, repelling Boer and German encroachment into Bechuanaland and dissolving Stellaland and Goshen.

Bechuanaland was proclaimed a British protectorate, with Mafeking as its capital. But Bechuanaland was later divided into two; separating Tswana lands along the Molopo and Nossob rivers-those to the north, Bechuanaland Protectorate, remained a British protectorate, eventually gaining independence in 1966 as the Republic of Botswana.

Those lands to the south of the Molopo, now part of present-day South Africa's North-West and Northern Cape provinces, including Mafikeng, became British Bechuanaland, a short-lived colony later handed to the Cape Colony. In 1910, the Cape Colony unified with Natal, the Transvaal and Orange Free State to found the Union of South Africa.

Even after the division of Bechuanaland which placed Mafeking outside of the Bechuanaland Protectorate, Mafeking remained the capital of Bechuanaland Protectorate (present day Botswana) until Gaborone was established in 1965.

=== Second Boer War and siege of Mafeking ===
At the outbreak of the Second Boer War in 1899, the town was besieged by the Boers. The Siege of Mafeking lasted 217 days from October 1899 to May 1900, and turned Robert Baden-Powell into a national hero. The use of adolescent boys as military auxiliaries helped lay the groundwork for the Scouting movement. In 1900, the British built a concentration camp in Mafeking to house Boer women and children. In September 1904, Lord Roberts unveiled an obelisk at Mafeking bearing the names of those who fell in defence of the town. British losses during the siege were 212 people killed, soldiers and civilians, and more than 600 wounded. Boer losses were significantly higher.

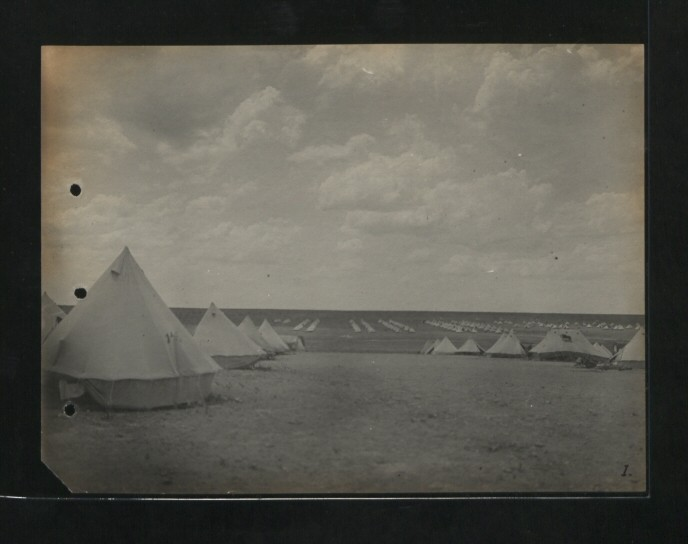
The British concentration camp of Mahikeng for Boers, 1901

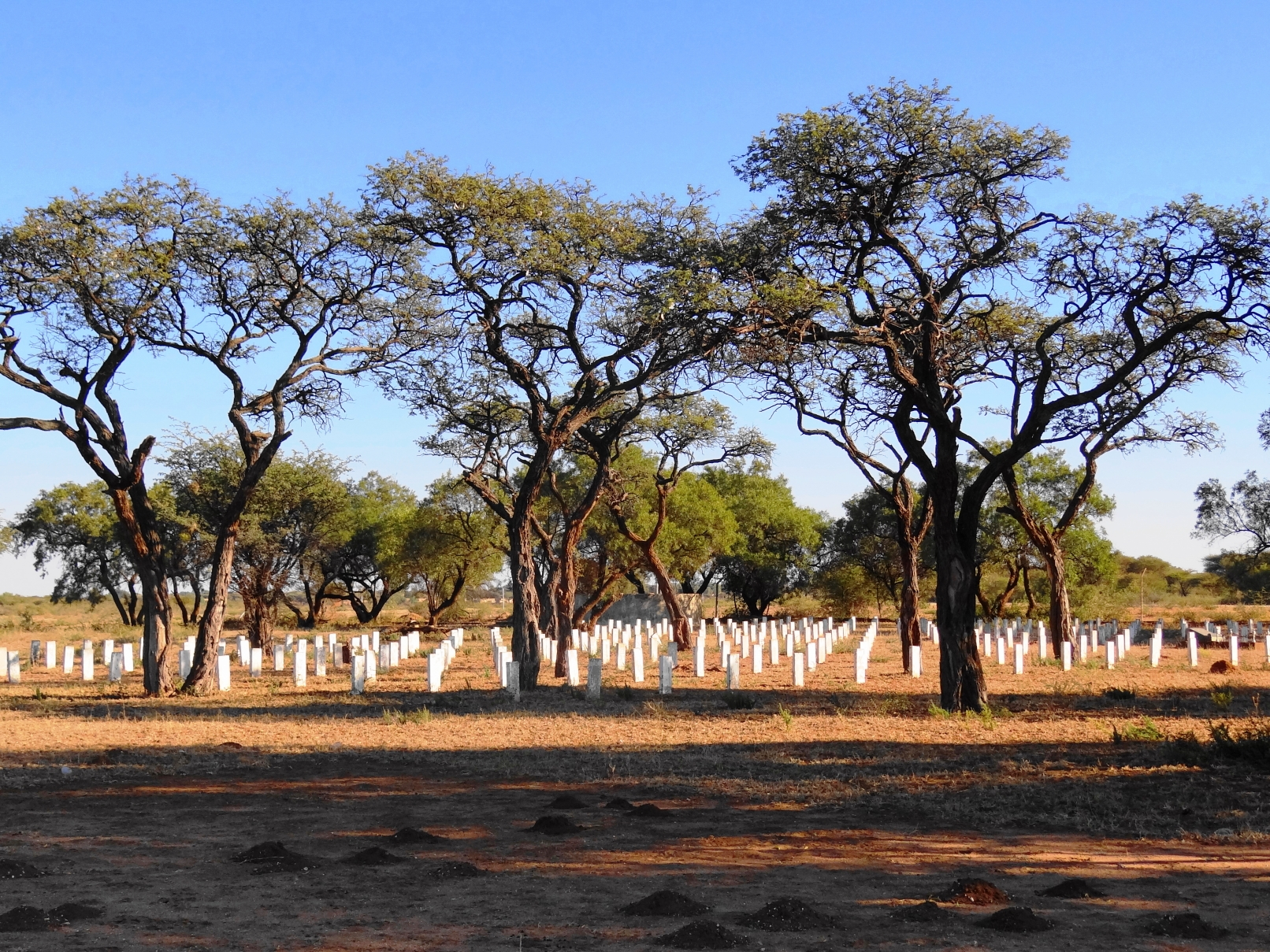
The cemetery of the camp

=== Incorporation into Bophuthatswana ===
Although it was outside the protectorate's borders, Mafeking served as capital of the Bechuanaland Protectorate from 1894 until 1965, when Gaborone was made the capital of what was to become Botswana. Mafeking also briefly served as capital of the Bantustan of Bophuthatswana in the 1970s, before the adjoining town of Mmabatho was established as capital when Bophuthatswana became nominally independent in 1977.

Following a local referendum, Mafeking joined Bophuthatswana in 1980 and was renamed Mafikeng. The town was treated as a suburb of Mmabatho.

=== Capital of North-West Province ===
Following the end of apartheid in 1994, Bophuthatswana was formally reincorporated into South Africa. With that, the merged Mafikeng and Mmabatho became capital of the new North-West Province under the name Mafikeng. The provincial legislature is located in the New Parliament Building in Mmabatho.

In February 2010, Lulu Xingwana, the Minister of Arts and Culture changed the town's name to Mahikeng.

== Major facilities ==
- The North-West University's Mahikeng campus, formerly the University of Bophuthatswana, is located in Mmabatho.
- Mafikeng railway station
- Mmabatho Stadium
- Mafikeng Airport
- Mafikeng Museum
- Mafikeng Game Reserve (4800 Ha) lies on the boundary of the city and can be accessed through its main gate off Jacaranda Drive in Mafikeng.
- Botsalano Game Reserve (5800 Ha)

== Notable people ==
Notable people from Mafikeng include:

- Khuli Chana, artist
- Presley Chweneyagae, actor and Oscar award winner
- Vuyo Dabula, actor
- Katlego Danke, actress
- Marius Gabriel, novelist
- Gail Mabalane, actress and business woman
- Bonang Matheba, media personality and businesswoman
- Fistaz Mixwell, DJ and music producer
- Mogoeng Mogoeng, Chief Justice of South Africa
- Judge Yvonne Mokgoro, former justice at the Constitutional Court of South Africa
- Keabetswe "KB" Motsilanyane, singer and actress.
- Zenzo Ngqobe, actor
- Cassper Nyovest, recording artist and producer.
- Hip Hop Pantsula (also known as HHP), artist
- Rapulana Seiphemo, actor
- Tuks Senganga, Motswako musician

== Climate ==
Mafikeng has a warm semi-arid climate (Köppen: BSh) with hot summers and mild, dry winters with cool nights. Mafikeng experiences a significant amount of sunshine throughout the year.

Climate data for Mafikeng, elevation 1,281 m (4,203 ft), (1991–2020 normals, extremes 1999–2023)
| Month | Jan | Feb | Mar | Apr | May | Jun | Jul | Aug | Sep | Oct | Nov | Dec | Year |
|---|---|---|---|---|---|---|---|---|---|---|---|---|---|
| Record high °C (°F) | 41.5 (106.7) | 37.8 (100.0) | 37.7 (99.9) | 33.0 (91.4) | 31.4 (88.5) | 31.5 (88.7) | 34.1 (93.4) | 32.5 (90.5) | 35.7 (96.3) | 38.3 (100.9) | 39.2 (102.6) | 40.7 (105.3) | 41.5 (106.7) |
| Mean daily maximum °C (°F) | 30.6 (87.1) | 30.1 (86.2) | 28.8 (83.8) | 26.0 (78.8) | 23.6 (74.5) | 20.9 (69.6) | 20.7 (69.3) | 23.7 (74.7) | 27.8 (82.0) | 29.8 (85.6) | 30.3 (86.5) | 30.6 (87.1) | 26.9 (80.4) |
| Daily mean °C (°F) | 24.2 (75.6) | 23.8 (74.8) | 22.2 (72.0) | 19.0 (66.2) | 15.7 (60.3) | 12.8 (55.0) | 12.5 (54.5) | 15.3 (59.5) | 19.4 (66.9) | 22.1 (71.8) | 23.1 (73.6) | 23.9 (75.0) | 19.5 (67.1) |
| Mean daily minimum °C (°F) | 17.8 (64.0) | 17.4 (63.3) | 15.6 (60.1) | 12.0 (53.6) | 7.7 (45.9) | 4.5 (40.1) | 4.1 (39.4) | 6.8 (44.2) | 10.9 (51.6) | 14.5 (58.1) | 15.8 (60.4) | 17.2 (63.0) | 12.0 (53.6) |
| Record low °C (°F) | 8.6 (47.5) | 7.6 (45.7) | 7.1 (44.8) | 1.6 (34.9) | −3.0 (26.6) | −5.1 (22.8) | −5.9 (21.4) | −5.1 (22.8) | −1.3 (29.7) | 5.3 (41.5) | 6.0 (42.8) | 10.5 (50.9) | −5.9 (21.4) |
| Average precipitation mm (inches) | 103.4 (4.07) | 80.5 (3.17) | 62.1 (2.44) | 44.8 (1.76) | 19.0 (0.75) | 5.4 (0.21) | 1.5 (0.06) | 3.2 (0.13) | 8.6 (0.34) | 34.7 (1.37) | 62.9 (2.48) | 92.8 (3.65) | 518.9 (20.43) |
| Average precipitation days | 8.8 | 7.3 | 6.3 | 4.6 | 1.9 | 0.7 | 0.2 | 0.5 | 1.1 | 4.1 | 6.0 | 9.1 | 50.5 |
| Mean monthly sunshine hours | 276.0 | 249.1 | 258.8 | 261.9 | 293.2 | 280.2 | 297.9 | 308.3 | 298.2 | 299.8 | 282.0 | 283.2 | 3,388.7 |
Source 1: NOAA
Source 2: Starlings Roost Weather (extremes)

== Bibliography ==
- J H Drummond and S M Parnell (1991). "Mafikeng-Mmabatho". In Anthony Lemon (ed.). Homes Apart: South Africa's Segregated Cities. Indiana University Press. ISBN 0-253-33321-0.
