= Molopo River =

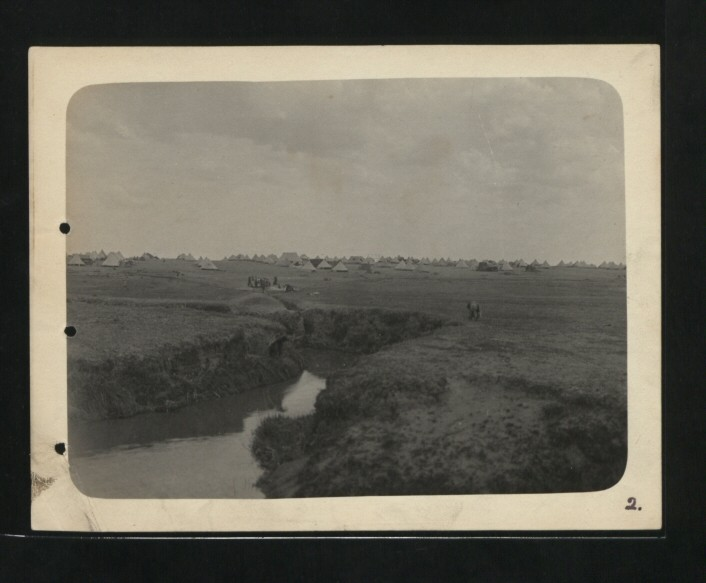

- Location of the Molopo River's mouth

Location
- Country: Botswana and South Africa
- Province: North West Province and Northern Cape

Physical characteristics
- Source: Molopo Oog
  - location: D1337, Ottoshoop, Mahikeng Local Municipality, 2866, North West Province, South Africa
  - coordinates: 25°53′19″S 26°1′37″E
- Mouth: Orange River
  - location: Near Augrabies Falls National Park, Northern Cape Province
  - coordinates: 28°31′02″S 20°12′46″E
  - elevation: 480 m (1,570 ft)
- Length: 970 km (600 mi)
- Basin size: 367,201 km^{2} (141,777 sq mi)

The Molopo River (Afrikaans: Moloporivier) is one of the main rivers in Southern Africa. It has a length of approximately 960 kilometres and a catchment area of 367,201 km^{2} with Botswana, Namibia and South Africa sharing roughly about a third of the basin each.

== Course ==
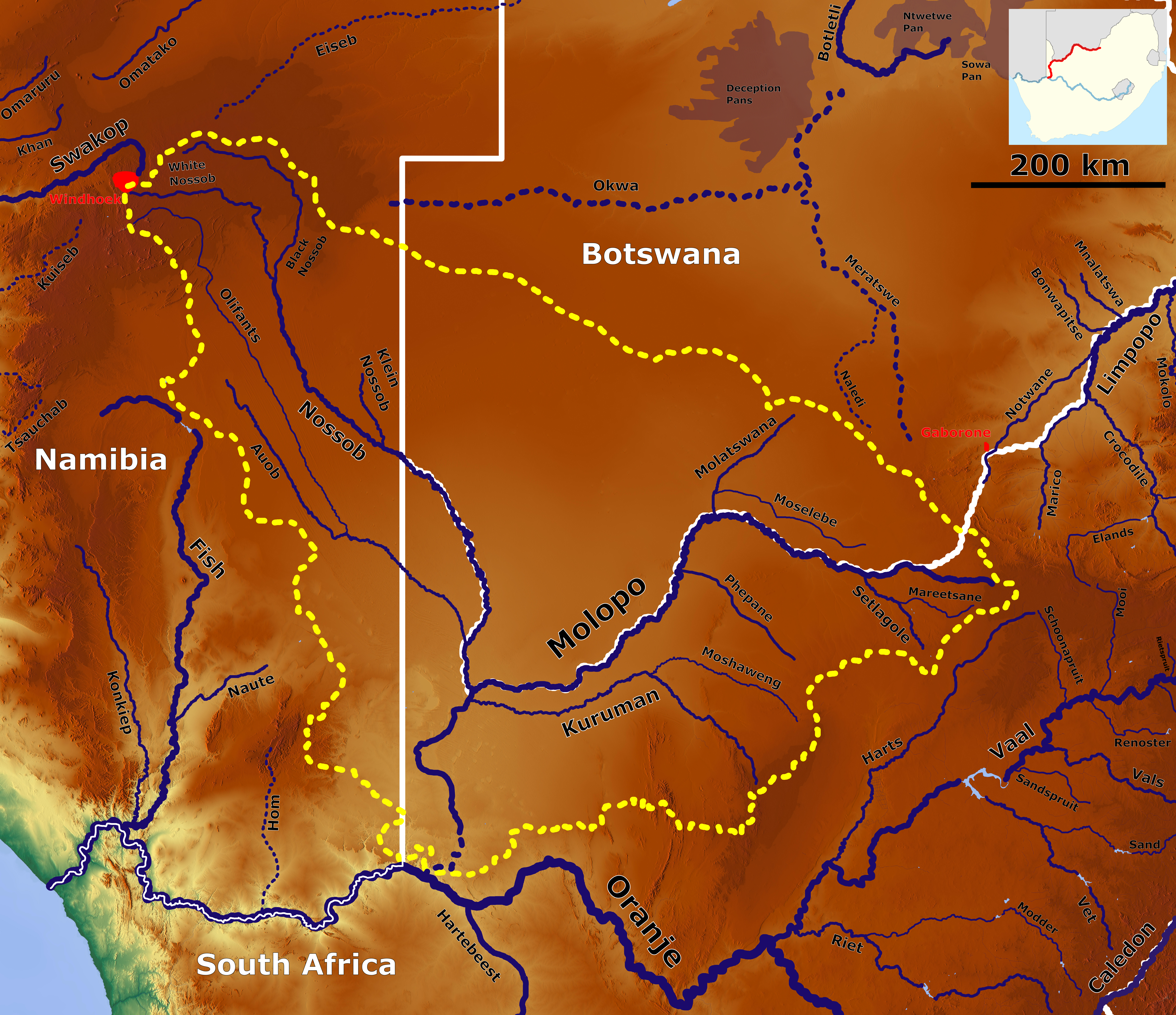
Molopo Basin

Its source is in the Molopo Oog (Eye of Molopo in Afrikaans), and the river generally flows first to the west, and then to the southwest from its source. In its middle course the Molopo River forms a significant section of the border between Botswana and South Africa.

River flow is intermittent and when it flows, its water flows very slowly owing to a gradient of only 0.76 m/km. Floods are rare because the vast sandveld areas of the Kalahari Desert on the Namibian side of its basin absorb all water from the seasonal rains. In case of exceptionally heavy and continuous precipitation the flow discharges into the Orange River, which it meets downstream of Augrabies Falls National Park at 28°31′02″S 20°12′46″E. It is believed that this last occurred more than 100 years ago.

== Tributary ==
The main tributary of the Molopo is the Nossob, whose confluence is some 50 km south of Twee Rivieren, at 890 metres or 2,920 feet above sea level. Other tributaries are:

- Kuruman River
- Phepane River
- Ramatlabama River
- Madebe River
- Modimola River
- Setlagoli River

== Dams ==
The upper Molopo is part of the Crocodile (West) and Marico Water Management Area and the lower is included in the Lower Vaal Water Management Area. Major dams in the river are the Setumo Dam and the Disaneng Dam, both located near the city of Mafikeng, South Africa, which lies on the banks of the river.

== See also ==
- List of rivers of South Africa
- List of dams and reservoirs in South Africa
