= Flag of Albany, New York =

The flag of Albany, New York, consists of a tricolour of orange, white and blue with the former containing the coat of arms of Albany, as designed in 1789. The flag is based on Prince's Flag as flown by the Dutch East India Company (VOC), for which Hudson sailed in 1609.

The flag was designed in 1909 as part of the tricentennial celebration of Henry Hudson's discovery of the Hudson River, but was not adopted until 1912 by the Albany Common Council. The banner has received a 5.2 rating by the North American Vexillological Association, ranking 34th out of 150 flags in the latter's 2004 survey.

== Design ==
The flag derives from Prince's Flag, a tricolor of orange, white and blue. It also hints to the large Dutch community in Albany. The flag features the coat of arms of Albany on the white stripe which consists of a shield held by a farmer and a Native American. A Dutch sail is above the shield and on a scroll is written ''Assiduity'' which means ''diligence''. The wheat sheaves on the shield and the colonial farmer supporter holding a sickle are for farming and agriculture. The beaver on top of the wheat sheaves reflects the fur trade between the Native American people, symbolized by the Native American supporter, and the Dutch, and later English, settlers. On the crest, the Dutch sloop represents the commerce of the area and Albany as a major port on the Hudson River.

== History ==
Created around 1572, Prince's Flag as flown by the Dutch East India Company (VOC), for which Hudson sailed in 1609. After 1660, the orange band was replaced by a red one as part of the creation of the Dutch flag but the reason such action was posed still remains unknown. The flag was designed in 1909 during the Hudson Fulton Celebration which commemorated Dutch explorer Henry Hudson's Hudson River exploration and Robert Fulton's steam-powered navigation invention. The flag was adopted officially 3 years later, in 1912. The banner faced controversy in 1916, when the Albany Common Council voted to change the colors to red, white, and blue as a show of patriotism during the ongoing World War I. The change was vetoed by Mayor Joseph Stevens. The banner has received a 5.2 rating by the North American Vexillological Association, ranking 34th out of 150 flags in the latter's 2004 survey.

== Controversy ==
In 2015, the flag was called racist for its implication with the Dutch East India Company, which trafficked slaves in the South. The flag was criticized again when a councilman demanded the flag to be changed in 2021. The councilman claimed the flag promoted white supremacy since the banner it is based on, the former Dutch flag, was later used by the Nazis. The flag shares same color codes on the tricolor pattern as the former flag of South Africa during the apartheid regime from 1948 to 1994. While acknowledging the former Dutch flag's link to far-right, The Economist wrote in 2015 that Albany's flag evoked "a different form of nostalgic local identity, one of Dutch liberalism".
