= Batavian flag =

Historical flag

Batavian flag.

The Batavian flag (contemporary Dutch: Bataafsche vlag; also called Nationale vlag, "National flag") is a Dutch historical flag. It was designed by Dirk Langendijk in January 1796, and introduced in March 1796 as the official flag of the navy of the Batavian Republic, replacing the Statenvlag (itself originating from the Prince's Flag).

== Description ==
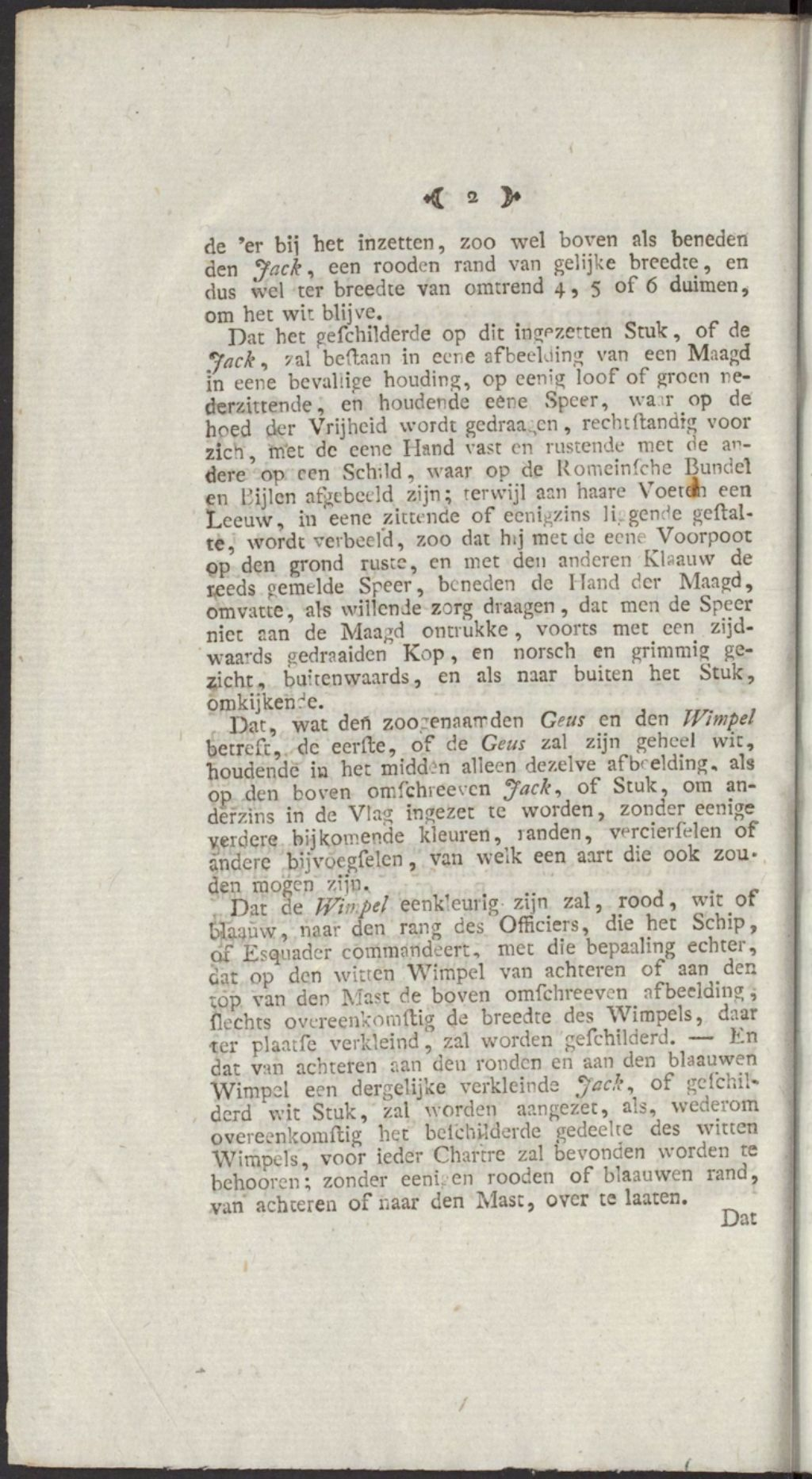
Decree of the States General, describing the Jack.

The flag's colours and rows remained exactly the same (although the red and blue appear to have grown darker), but an important alteration was done by adding a jack in the upper left corner, several thumbs from the flagpole. This constituted a white rectangle, containing:

- the Dutch, Batavian or Freedom Maiden;
- the Dutch or Batavian Lion or Leo Belgicus;
- a spear, held by both the Maiden and the Lion;
- a liberty hat on top of the spear;
- a shield with a fasces, held by the Maiden;
- some green and leaves as base and background.

== History ==
On 1 March 1796, the Batavian flag was introduced as the Batavian Navy's ensign. The flag, without the Dutch Maiden in the upper left-hand corner, was adopted as the Kingdom of Holland's flag on 5 June 1806. This angered many Dutch sailors as they were used to the Statenvlag, under which they had won many battles in decades past. In August 1806, a riot broke out amongst the crews of the navy of the Kingdom of Holland's Texel and Amsterdam squadrons, stating they no longer wished to sail under the new flag. Several sailors refused to take an oath of loyalty to King Louis Bonaparte, and declared they did not want to take orders from his officers.

The mutiny was severely punished, with one mutineer being shot through the head at point-blank range by Vice-admiral Jan Willem de Winter. To calm the mutineers down, the Statenvlag was hoisted on the Dutch navy's warships, bringing the mutiny to an end. As a result of the mutiny, the Statenvlag became the Dutch navy's de facto flag, which was affirmed by a royal decree issued on 1 December 1807. However, its name was changed to Koninklijke Hollandsche Vlag ("Royal Flag of Holland").
