= Tricentennial Park =

Tricentennial Park is the name of several parks throughout the United States:

- William G. Milliken State Park and Harbor– formerly the Tri-centennial State Park in Michigan
- Tricentennial Park (Albany, New York)
- Tricentennial Park (Ponce, Puerto Rico)
