= Flag of the Netherlands =

Kingdom of the Netherlands
- Rood-wit-blauw ('Red-white-blue')
- Use: National flag and ensign
- Proportion: 2∶3
- Adopted: 1575; 451 years ago (first full colour depiction); 1596; 430 years ago (red replacement for orange); 1796; 230 years ago (embellished with Dutch Maiden); 1937; 89 years ago (red reaffirmed); 1949; 77 years ago (colours standardised)
- Design: A horizontal triband of red (bright vermilion), white, and cobalt blue
- Marine Geus or Prinsengeus
- Use: Naval jack
- Proportion: 2:3
- Adopted: Late 17th c. (in use); 20 April 1931 (formalised)
- Design: 12 segments in the national colours of red (bright vermilion), white, and cobalt blue
- Royal Standard of the Netherlands
- Use: Standard of the Monarch
- Proportion: 1:1
- Adopted: 27 August 1908
- Design: Orange field divided in four by a nassau-blue cross, showing bugle-horns of the Principality of Orange and the coat of arms of the Kingdom, surrounded by a crown and the insignia of the Military Order of William.

The national flag of the Netherlands (Dutch: de Nederlandse flag) is a horizontal tricolour of red, white, and blue. The current design originates as a variant of the late 16th century orange-white-blue Prinsenvlag ("Prince's Flag"), evolving in the early 17th century as the red-white-blue Statenvlag ("States Flag"), the naval flag of the States-General of the Dutch Republic, making the Dutch flag the oldest tricolour flag in continuous use. As a flag that symbolises the transformation from monarchy to republic, it has inspired both the derivative Russian flag, and after the French Revolution in 1789, the vertically striped French tricolour; both flags in turn influenced many other tricolours. During the 1920s and the economic crisis of the 1930s, the old Prince's Flag with the colour orange gained some popularity among Protestants, Orangists, conservative liberals, fascists, and others. To end the confusion, the colours red, white and blue and its official status as the national flag of the Kingdom of the Netherlands were reaffirmed by royal decree on 19 February 1937.

== Description ==
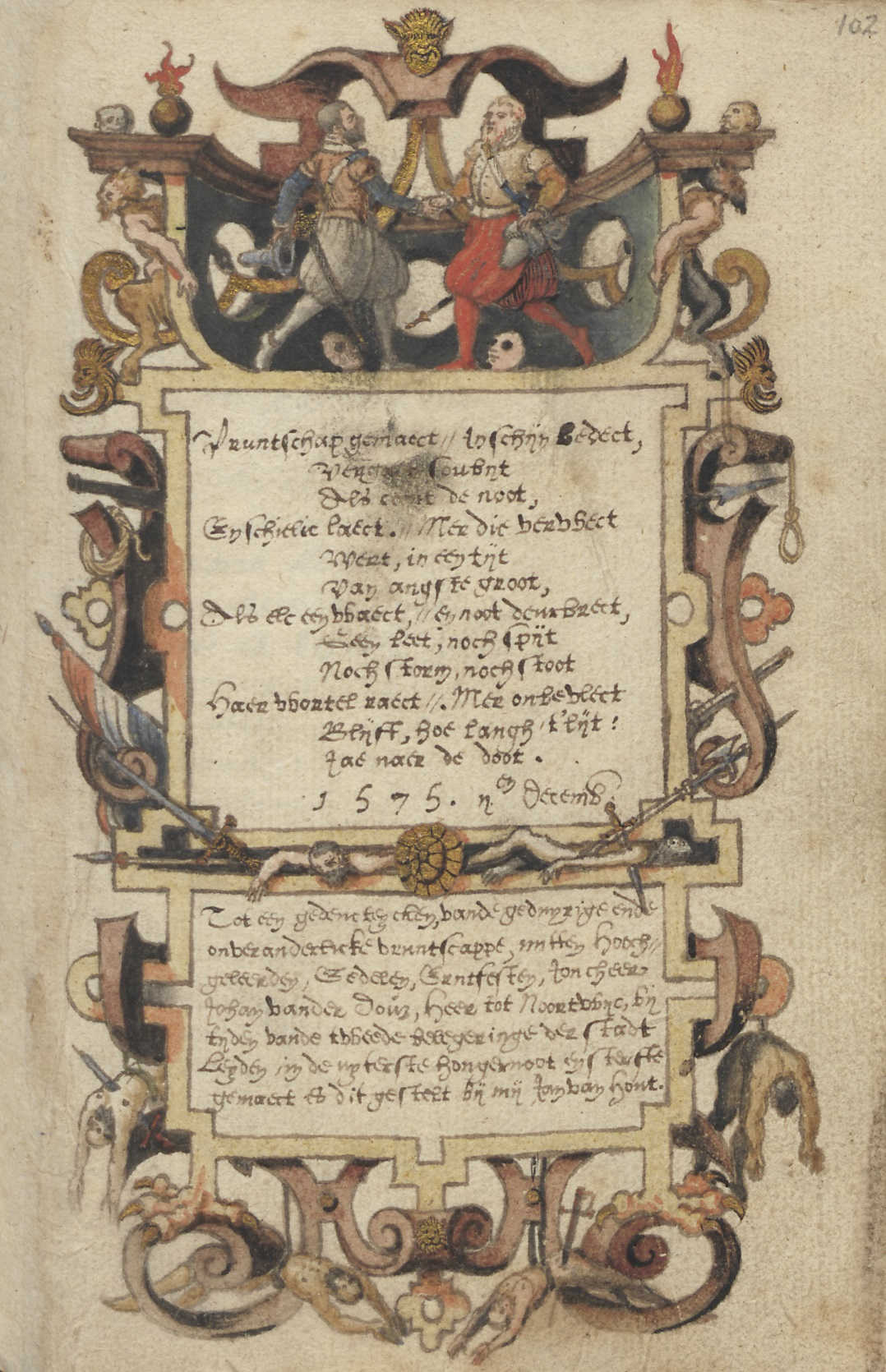
Vruntschap of Jan van Hout (1575), the oldest known colour illustration of the Dutch flag. The flag is sticking out at the left of the top panel.

The national flag of the Netherlands is a tricolour flag. The horizontal fesses are bands of equal size in the colours from top to bottom, red (officially described as a "bright vermilion"), white (silver), and blue ("cobalt blue"). The flag proportions (width:length) are 2:3. The colour parameters were defined in November 1958 by the NEN (former HCNN) in as the following:

Scheme	Bright vermilion	White	Cobalt blue
Chromatic	X = 18.3 Y=10.0 Z=3.0	Y = 100.0	X = 7.5 Y=6.6 Z=25.3
CMYK	0.83.78.32	0.0.0.0	77.47.0.48
RGB	(173,29,37)	(255,255,255)	(30,71,133)
Hexadecimal	#AD1D25	#FFFFFF	#1E4785
RAL	2002	9010	5013

In this definition, the colours are defined using CIE-1931 colour space and Standard illuminant C at a 45° angle.

The flag of the Netherlands is similar to that of Luxembourg, but it has a smaller width and it uses slightly darker shades of red and blue. The similarity of the two flags has given rise to a national debate to change the flag of Luxembourg, initiated by Michel Wolter in 2006.

=== Symbolism ===
According to heraldic traditions, red symbolizes bravery, strength, valor, and hardiness, white symbolizes peace and honesty, and blue symbolizes vigilance, truth, loyalty, perseverance, and justice.

Another theory is that the colors used to be a symbol of society: red symbolizes the people, white the church and blue the nobility.

== History ==
=== Middle Ages ===
The Cross of Burgundy flag

At the end of the 15th century, when the majority of the Netherlands provinces were united under the Duke of Burgundy, the Cross of Burgundy flag of the Duke of Burgundy was used for joint expeditions, which consisted of a red saltire resembling two crossed, roughly-pruned (knotted) branches, on a white field. Under the later House of Habsburg this flag remained in use.

=== Prince's Flag ===
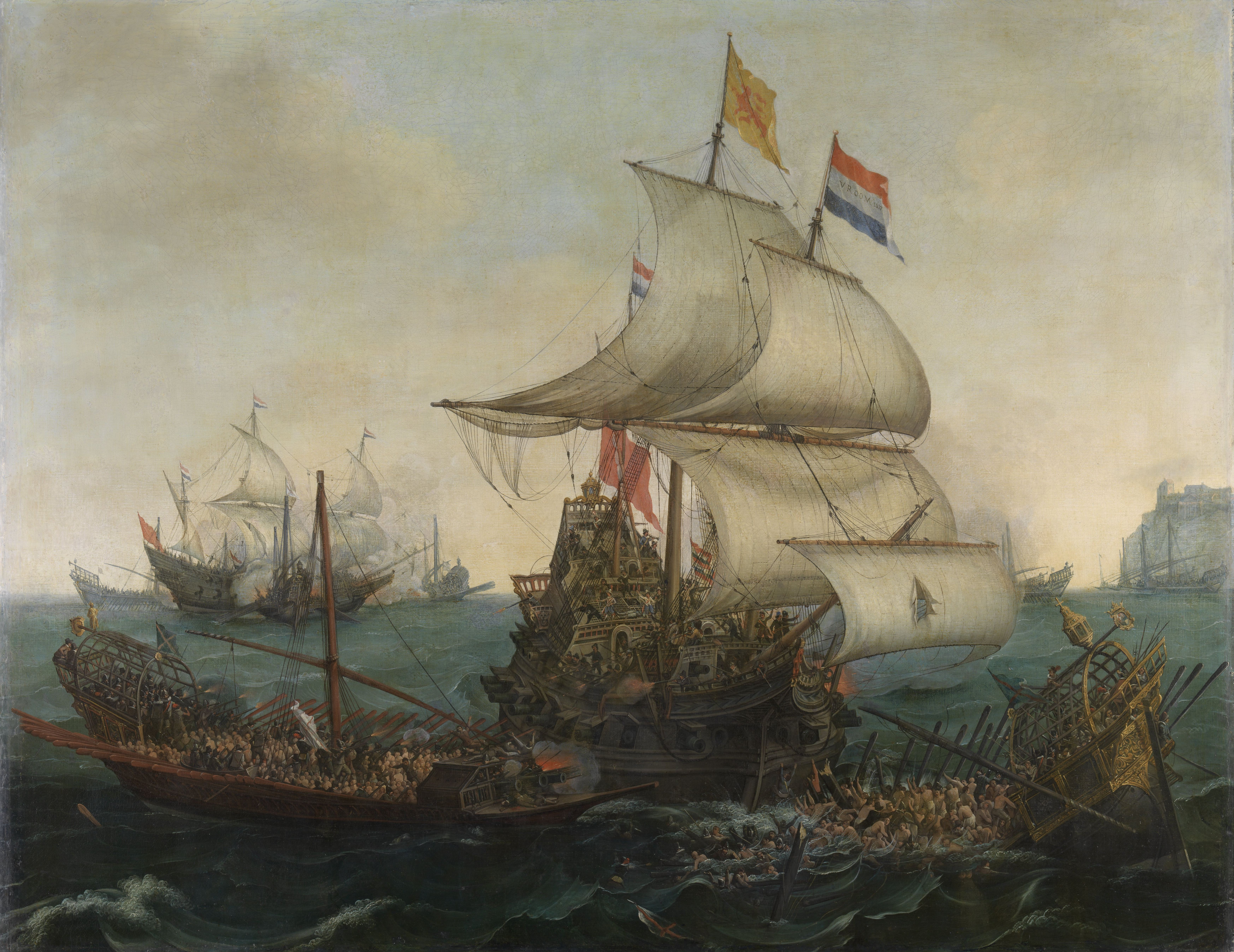
Dutch ships ramming Spanish galleys off the English coast, 3 October 1602 (Hendrick Cornelisz Vroom, 1617)

The Prince's Flag (1570s–1652)

In 1568 provinces of the Low Countries rose in revolt against King Philip II of Spain, and Prince William of Orange (1533–1584) placed himself at the head of the rebels. The etymology of the House of Orange is unrelated to the name of the fruit or the colour. Usage of the colours orange, white and blue (Dutch: Oranje, Wit, Blauw, from French Orange, Blanc, Bleu) was based on the livery of William and was first recorded in the siege of Leiden in 1574, when Dutch officers wore orange-white-blue brassards. The first known full colour depiction of the flag appeared in 1575. In Ghent in 1577, William was welcomed with a number of theatrical allegories represented by a young girl wearing orange, blue and white. The first explicit reference to a naval flag in these colours is found in the ordonnances of the Admiralty of Zeeland, dated 1587, i.e. shortly after William's death.

The colour combination of orange, white, and blue is commonly considered the first Dutch flag. The 400th anniversary of the introduction of the Dutch flag was commemorated in the Netherlands by the issue of a postage stamp in 1972. That was based on the fact that in 1572 the Watergeuzen (Gueux de mer, "Sea Beggars"), the pro-Dutch privateers, captured Den Briel in name of William, Prince of Orange. However, it is uncertain whether they took an orange-white-blue flag with them on the event, although they certainly started using an orange-white-blue tricolour somewhat later in the 1570s. It became later known as the Prinsenvlag ("Prince's flag") and served as the basis for the former South African flag, the flags of New York City and the Flag of Albany, New York, all three former dominions of the Dutch Republic.

=== Statenvlag ===
The Statenvlag (1652–1795) and (1795–1806)

Red as replacement for orange appeared as early as 1597, but more often after about 1630, as indicated by paintings of that time. Red gradually replaced orange (1630–60) as a sign of political change and growing dissociation of the Republic from the House of Orange. It appears that prior to 1664, the red-white-blue tricolour was commonly known as the "Flag of Holland" (Hollandsche Vlag); named after one of the revolting provinces. In 1664, the States of Zeeland, another revolting province, complained about this, and a resolution of the States-General introduced the name "States Flag" (Statenvlag), which the red, white and blue tricolour will be known hereafter. The Dutch navy between 1588 and 1630 had always displayed the Prince's Flag, and after 1663 always the States Flag, with both flag variants being in use during the period of 1630–1662.

The red-white-blue triband flag as used in the 17th century is said to have influenced the designs of both the seminal Russian flag and the French flag. In turn, these two flags would later influence many others.

=== Flag of the Batavian Navy (Batavian flag) ===
Ensign of the Batavian Navy (1796–1806)

With the Batavian Revolution in the Netherlands in the last decade of the 18th century, and the subsequent conquest by the French, the name "Prince's Flag" was forbidden and the red-white-blue of the Statenvlag was the only flag allowed, analogous as it was to France's own tricolour, chosen just a few months earlier, ironically influenced by that same Statenvlag. In a separate flag prepared for the navy in 1796, the red division of the flag was embellished with the figure of a Netherlands maiden, with a lion at her feet, in the upper left corner. In one hand she bore a shield with the Roman fasces and in the other a lance crowned with the cap of liberty. This flag had a life as short as that of the Batavian Republic for which it was created. Louis Bonaparte, made king of Holland by his brother the Emperor Napoleon, wished to pursue a purely Dutch policy and to respect national sentiments as much as possible. He removed the maiden of freedom from the flag and restored the old tricolour. His pro-Dutch policies led to conflicts with his brother, however, and the Netherlands were incorporated into the French Empire. In 1810 its flag was replaced by the imperial emblems.

=== Modern flag ===
In 1813, the Netherlands regained its independence and the Prince of Orange returned from exile and contemporary newspapers report that the red-white-blue flag was flown decorated with an orange Pennon/pennant and solid‐coloured orange flags were displayed in many places in the country as a sign of allegiance of the people to the House of Orange.

Just before the outbreak of World War II, the Prince's Flag resurfaced again. Some people were convinced that orange, white, and blue were the true colours of the Dutch flag, particularly members of the National Socialist Movement in the Netherlands. To end the discussion, a royal decree established the colours of the Dutch flag as: 'The colours of the flag of the Kingdom of the Netherlands are red, white and blue' (Dutch: De kleuren van de vlag van het Koninkrijk der Nederlanden zijn rood, wit en blauw). It became the shortest decree in history, and was issued by Queen Wilhelmina on 19 February 1937.

It was only on 16 August 1949 that the exact colour parameters were defined by the Ministry of the Navy as bright vermilion (red), white and cobalt blue. The pennant is usually added on King's Day (Dutch: Koningsdag, 27 April) or other festive occasions related to the Royal Family.

== Display and use ==
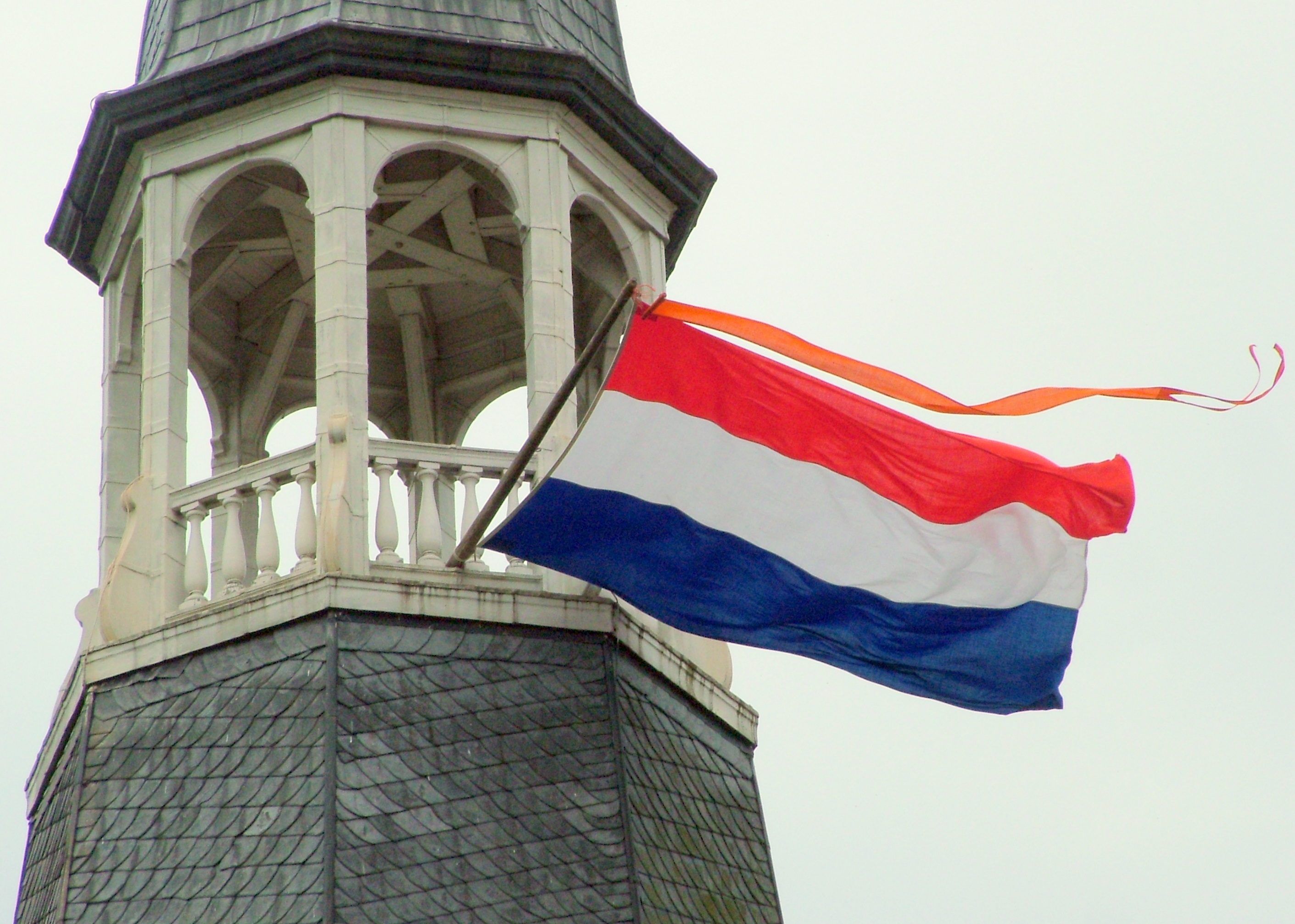
Added orange pennant on Koningsdag

The flag is customarily flown at government buildings and military bases in the Netherlands and abroad all year round. Private use is more uncommon. Only on national holidays is there widespread private use. At the birthdays or weddings of specific members of the Royal House, an orange pennant is added to the flag. There are special non-holiday festivities or remembrance occasions when the flag is flown, such as at the homes of students who have just graduated. The flag is then often accompanied by the graduate's school bag hung from the tip of the flagpole. The flag can also be displayed at times of sadness at half-mast (or a black pennant is added to the flag when hanging at half-mast is not possible) as a sign of respect or national mourning.

There are a number of flag-flying days in the Netherlands. The holidays on which flags are put out by the government, according to the flag instruction, are:

Date	Occasion	Half-mast?	Orange pennant?
31 January (1 February)	Birthday of Princess Beatrix	No	Yes
27 April (26 April)	Koningsdag (King's Day), birthday of King Willem-Alexander	No	Yes
4 May	Remembrance of the Dead (flags are put out at 18:00 until sunset, which is at ca. 21:10)	Yes	No
5 May	Liberation Day	No	No
17 May (18 May)	Birthday of Queen Máxima	No	Yes
Last Saturday of June	Veterans' Day	No	No
15 August (16 August)	Formal end of World War II (surrender of Japan)	No	No
Third Tuesday of September	Prinsjesdag (only in The Hague)	No	No
7 December (8 December)	Birthday of the Princess of Orange	No	Yes
15 December (16 December)	Koninkrijksdag (Kingdom Day)	No	No

The dates mentioned in parentheses are the dates when the flags are put out, should the original scheduled flag day fall on a Sunday, when possible. Exceptions are Remembrance of the Dead and Liberation Day, should one of them fall on a Sunday, the flags are put out anyway.

The prime minister of the Netherlands is responsible for announcing updates to the flag instruction (last given in 2013 when Queen's Day on 30 April became King's Day on 27 April), announcing one-off flag days (last given on 19 March 2019 to remember the Utrecht tram shooting), and announcing one-off modifications to the current flag days (last given in 2020 when the flags were put out at half-mast on 4 May the whole day instead of from 18:00, due to the 75-year anniversary of the liberation of the Netherlands and the COVID-19 pandemic).

When a member of the Dutch Royal House is born, the flag instruction will be determined some weeks before the child is expected. In the most recent occasions – in 2003, 2005 and 2007, when Princess Máxima was expecting Princess Amalia, Princess Alexia and Princess Ariane respectively, it was announced that immediately upon announcement of the birth, the flags would be put out with the orange pennant. However, because Amalia and Ariane were born while darkness already fell (and Amalia was born on a Sunday), the flag day was postponed until the next day.

== Flags of current countries in the Kingdom of the Netherlands ==
=== Flag of Aruba ===
Flag of Aruba

The national flag of Aruba was officially adopted on 18 March 1976. The blue field represents the sky, the sea, peace, hope, Aruba's future and its ties to the past. The two narrow stripes "suggest the movement toward status aparte". One represents "the flow of tourists to sun-drenched Aruba, enriching the island as well as vacationers", the other "industry, all the minerals (gold and phosphates in the past, petroleum in the early 20th century)". In addition to sun, gold, and abundance, the yellow is also said to represent wanglo (Tribulus cistoides) flowers. The star has particularly complex symbolism. It is vexillologically unusual in having four points, representing the four cardinal directions. These refer in turn to the many countries of origin of the people of Aruba. They also represent the four main languages of Aruba: Papiamento, Spanish, English, and Dutch. The star also represents the island itself: a land of often red soil bordered by white beaches in a blue sea. The red also represents blood shed by Arubans during war, past Indian inhabitants, patriotic love, and Brazil wood. The white also represents purity and honesty.

=== Flag of Curaçao ===
Flag of Curaçao

The flag of Curaçao is a navy blue field with a horizontal hot yellow stripe slightly below the midline and two white, five-pointed stars in the canton. The blue symbolises the sea and sky (the bottom and top blue sections, respectively) divided by a yellow stroke representing the bright sun which bathes the island. The two stars represent Curaçao and Klein Curaçao, but also 'Love & Happiness'. The five points on each star symbolise the five continents from which Curaçao's people come.

=== Flag of Sint Maarten ===
Flag of Sint Maarten

The flag of Sint Maarten is the national flag of the Dutch part of Saint Martin island, which is a country within the Kingdom of the Netherlands. It was adopted on 13 June 1985. It resembles the war flag of the Philippines.

== Flags of former countries in the Kingdom of the Netherlands ==
=== Suriname ===
Flag of Suriname until 1975

The pre-independence flag of Suriname consisted of five coloured stars (from top left clockwise: white, black, brown, yellow, and red) connected by an ellipse. The coloured stars represent the major ethnic groups that comprise the Surinamese population: the original Amerindians, the colonising Europeans, the Africans brought in as slaves to work in plantations and the Indians, Javanese and Chinese who came as indentured workers to replace the Africans who escaped slavery and settled in the hinterland. The ellipse represents the harmonious relationship amongst the groups.

=== Netherlands Antilles ===
Flag of the Netherlands Antilles from 1959 to 1986

Flag of the Netherlands Antilles from 1986 to 2010, after the secession of Aruba

Within the flag of the Netherlands Antilles, there were five stars that symbolise the five islands that made up the country. While the colours red, white and blue refer to the flag of the Netherlands. A six-star version was used until 1986 when Aruba became its own country within the Kingdom. This original version was adopted on 19 November 1959. This flag fell into disuse when the Netherlands Antilles was dissolved on 10 October 2010. The islands of Sint Maarten and Curaçao obtained their separate country status within the Kingdom and the islands Bonaire, St. Eustatius and Saba are now overseas entities of the Netherlands.

== Flags of former colonies of the Kingdom of the Netherlands ==
Flag of the Dutch East India Company

Flag of the Dutch West India Company

Flag used by the Dutch West India Company in Dutch Brazil

=== Dutch West India Company ===
==== New Holland (Brazil) ====
The flag of Dutch Brazil, or New Holland, also known as the flag of Dutch Brazil, was the flag used by the Vereenigde West-Indische Compagnie (English: Dutch West India Company) for the territories that were under its control in Brazil from 1630 until 1654.

The flag consists of three horizontal stripes in the colours of the flag of the Republic of the Seven United Netherlands (red, white and blue) and it displays a monogram on the central stripe and a crown on the upper stripe, both gold-coloured. The origin of the monogram as well as its initials and its meaning is not known.

==== New Netherland (United States) ====
The orange-white-blue Prince's Flag directly inspired historical and modern day flags in the former Dutch colony of New Netherland in what is today the East Coast of the United States. The colony of New Netherland used the Statenvlag of the Dutch Republic, and was one of the territories under control of the Dutch West India Company. The flag of New York City, originally called New Amsterdam, was designed after the Prince's Flag. Furthermore, the flags of other counties, cities, and institutions in this region are designed after the Prince's Flag, such as Albany (originally Beverwijck), Schenectady County, New York, and Jersey City.

Flag of Schenectady County

Flag of Albany, New York

Flag of The Bronx

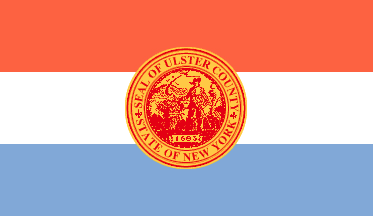
Flag of Ulster County, New York

Flag of New York City

Flag of Manhattan

Flag of the mayor of New York City

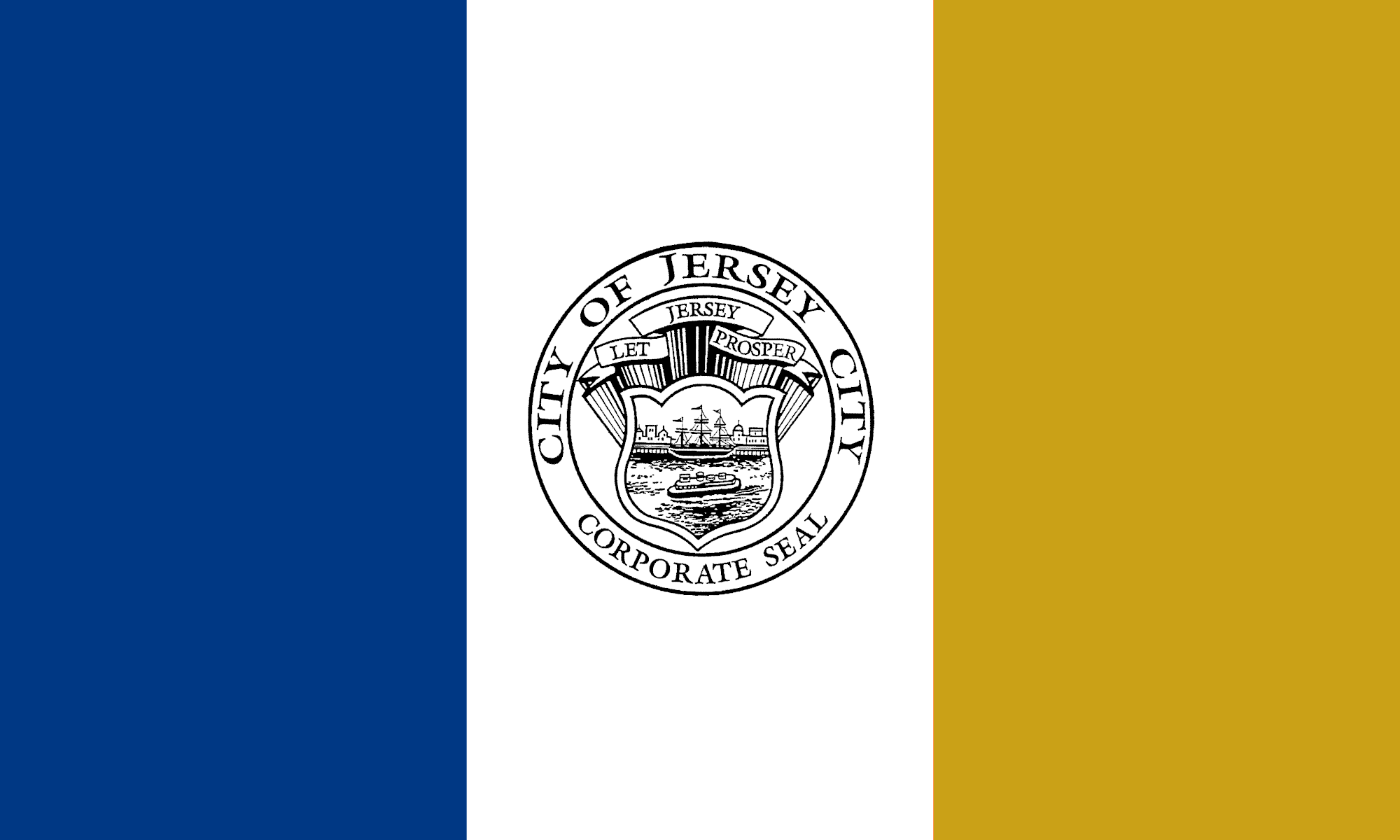
Flag of Jersey City, New Jersey

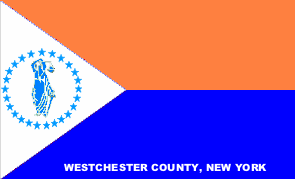
Flag of Westchester County, New York

Flag of Nassau County, New York

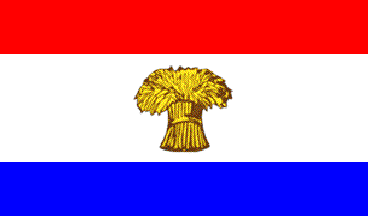
Flag of Sussex County, Delaware

Flag of Hofstra University

Flag of Brooklyn, New York. Not inspired by the Dutch flag but contains the Old-Dutch words "Een Draght Maekt Maght" (Dutch: Eendracht maakt macht, English: Unity makes strength), a motto that was originally used by the Dutch Republic.

=== Dutch East India Company ===
==== Netherlands East Indies ====
Flag of Indonesia

For the majority of the existence of the Netherlands East Indies the flag of the Vereenigde Oost-Indische Compagnie (English: Dutch East India Company) was used. When the VOC became bankrupt and was formally dissolved in 1800, its possessions and debt were taken over by the government of the Batavian Republic. The VOC's territories became the Netherlands East Indies and were expanded over the course of the 19th century to include the whole of the Indonesian archipelago. As such, the flag of the Batavian Republic and Kingdom of the Netherlands were used.

The flag of Hotel Yamato, made by ripping the blue band off the Dutch flag

The flag of the Netherlands has been said to be the origin of the Indonesian flag. To symbolise the intention of forcing out the Dutch, Indonesian nationalists would rip apart the Dutch flag. They tore off the bottom third of the flag, separating the red and white colours from the blue.

==== Netherlands New Guinea ====
Morning Star flag

The Morning Star flag (Indonesian: Bintang Kejora) represented the Netherlands New Guinea from 1 December 1961 until 1 October 1962 when the territory came under administration of the United Nations Temporary Executive Authority (UNTEA). The flag is commonly used by the West Papuan population including OPM (Organisasi Papua Merdeka; Free Papua Movement) supporters to rally self-determination human rights support and is popularly flown on 1 December each year in defiance of Indonesian domestic laws. The flag consists of a red vertical band along the hoist side, with a white five-pointed star in the centre. The flag was first raised on 1 December 1961 and used until the United Nations became the territory's administrator on 1 October 1962.

==== South Africa ====
The flag of the Boer Republics, Transvaal, the Orange Free State, Natalia Republic, and the flag of South Africa from 1928 to 1994 are all based on the flag of the Netherlands, or its predecessor the Prince's Flag. These were in turn part of the inspiration for the present South African flag.

Flag of South Africa

Flag of the Afrikaners

Flag of South Africa (1928–1994)

Flag of the South African Republic (Transvaal)

Flag of the Orange Free State

Flag of Nieuwe Republiek

Flag of Klein Vrystaat

Flag of Griqualand East

Flag of the Natalia Republic and the Republic of Klip River

Flag of Republic of Swellendam, Lydenburg Republic, Republic of Graaff-Reinet, the Utrecht Republic and the Lydenburg Republic

== Other related flags ==
As the Prince's Flag was the first created tricolour flag, it (in)directly inspired many historical and modern day tricolour flags. The flags below are directly influenced by the Dutch flag, or its predecessors, in colour use and design as a result of a shared history (as flags of former colonies) or economic relations, which is the case for the Russian flag. See the flags in the former colonies section above for more examples.

=== Dutch flag-inspired ===
The modern red-white-blue Dutch flag is the oldest tricolour flag in use, and directly inspired these historical and modern day flags:

Flag of the Netherlands, as reference

Flag of France

Flag of Paraguay

Flag of Hesse-Nassau

Flag of Schleswig-Holstein

Flag of Labuan

Flag of Johor Bahru

Flag of Nimba County
- The design of the French flag was adopted after the French Revolution, where the revolutionaries were influenced by the horizontally striped red-white-blue flag of the Netherlands.
- The flag of Hesse-Nassau is identical to that of the Netherlands. The Dutch royal house originates from the Duchy of Nassau.
- The flag of Nimba County, Liberia similar to the Dutch flag, superimposed with Liberian flag in the canton.
- The flags of Labuan and Johor Bahru in Malaysia are similar to the Dutch flag, each with a crescent and star in the centre.

==== Pan-Slavic colours ====
The Russian flag in turn is believed to have influenced many flags of other Slavic countries, resulting in many red-white-blue styled tribands in other parts of Europe, and also the red-white-green flag of Bulgaria. Peter the Great of Russia was building a new Russian Navy mostly on Dutch standards; therefore the merchant flag of Russia at sea would be the inverted colours of the Dutch flag.

Flag of Russia, as reference

Flag of Bulgaria

Flag of Croatia

Flag of the Czech Republic

Flag of Slovakia

Flag of Slovenia

Flag of Serbia

Flag of the Kingdom of Yugoslavia (1918–1941)

Flag of SFR Yugoslavia (1946–1992)

Flag of Serbia and Montenegro (1992–2006)

=== Prince's Flag-inspired ===
The orange-white-blue Prince's Flag directly inspired many historical and modern day flags. Especially flags in the former colonies of New Netherland and South Africa are designed after this flag. See the flags in the former colonies section above for more examples.

Prince's Flag, as reference

Variant on the Prince's Flag

Flag of the Orange Free State

Naval jack Brielse Geus

Flag of South Africa (1928–1994)

Flag of New York City

Flag of Orania

=== Cross of Burgundy-inspired ===
Cross of Burgundy, as reference

Flag of Shanghai Municipal Council, Shanghai International Settlement (c. 1917 – 1943)
- The flag of Shanghai Municipal Council in Shanghai International Settlement included multiple flags to symbolize the countries that had participated in the creation and management of this enclave in the Chinese city of Shanghai. The Dutch flag was put along with old Swedish civil ensign (spread vertically), the Austrian flag and old Spanish merchant ensign around the lower shield; all of them were upside down.

== See also ==
- List of flags of the Netherlands
- Flags of the Dutch royal family
- Flags of the provinces of the Netherlands
- List of municipal flags of the Netherlands
- Dutch national flag problem
