= Coat of arms of Albany, New York =

- Armiger: Albany
- Adopted: 1789
- Crest: A sloop with three sails and a blue flag
- Torse: Argent and gules
- Shield: Party per fess argent and gules: Upper section: a tree prostrate being gnawed by a beaver on a silver background; Lower section: two sheaves of wheat on a red background
- Supporters: A European farmer on the left and an American Indian on the right
- Motto: Assiduity

The coat of arms of Albany, New York, is the heraldic symbol representing the city of Albany, the capital of the U.S. state of New York. The coat of arms is rarely seen by itself; it is almost always used in the city seal or on the city flag. The current coat of arms was adopted in 1789, although prior to that it was significantly simpler, ranging from stylized lettering to a caricature of a beaver. Included in the coat of arms are references to Albany's agricultural and fur-trading past. It is supported by a white man and an American Indian and is crested by a sloop. The coat of arms is meant to represent the "symbols of industry and its rewards to man and beast on land and sea".

== Description ==
The current coat of arms consists of numerous traditional heraldic attributes. The shield is party per fess argent and gules; that is, split horizontally in two with a red lower half and silver upper half. Its lower half contains two golden sheaves of wheat on a red background; this design represents Albany's agricultural past. The upper half, which has a silver background, depicts a beaver gnawing at the stump of a fallen tree. This scene represents Beverwyck's former fur trade, which was vital to the development of Albany. One supporter can be seen on each side of the shield. The man on the left is a European-descended farmer dressed in simple clothes; he is supporting the shield with his left hand. His right hand rests on his hip and a sickle hangs from his waist; this references Albany's former agricultural society. The man on the right is an American Indian dressed in a loin cloth and wearing moccasins and a quiver. He supports the shield with his right hand and holds a bow over his left shoulder. The two men supporting the shield together represent the cooperation between white immigrants and Indians in the early development of the city, which would not have existed without the Indian fur trade. The men stand on a scroll displaying the motto Assiduity, meaning "the quality of acting with constant and careful attention". The torse is argent and gules, following the pattern of the shield. The crest is a sloop under full sail facing left, "denoting Albany's supremacy at the head of the sloop navigation of the Hudson River". The coat of arms represents the "symbols of industry and its rewards to man and beast on land and sea". At the time of Albany's bicentennial (1886), it was believed that only New York City and Albany possessed arms charged on a shield upheld by supporters.

== Uses ==
The flag of Albany incorporates the coat of arms on the center of the 16th-century flag of the Dutch Republic.

The seal of Albany places the coat of arms on an outlined, white circle, with the letters, "The Seal of the City of Albany" above it.

This statue of the coat of arms was done by local cartoonist Hy Rosen and installed in 1986.

Albany's coat of arms is best known for its use on the city seal and flag. The seal incorporates the coat of arms in an outlined, white circle, with the letters, "The Seal of the City of Albany" above it. The flag is a horizontal tricolor of orange, white, and blue, and was adopted in 1909 as part of the tricentennial celebration of Henry Hudson's discovery of the Hudson River. It was based on the Prince's Flag as flown by the Dutch East India Company (VOC), for which Hudson sailed in 1609. Its flag was also a tricolor and included the company's logo where the Albany coat of arms is located today. The flag also reflects the Dutch heritage of New York State.

A life-size sculpture of the coat of arms was created by artist and former Times Union political cartoonist Hy Rosen in 1986. Rosen took some liberty with the design, such as adding farm tools to emphasize the city's agricultural and trading history, as well as adding previously undocumented detail; the left supporter also takes on more of the look of an explorer (e.g., Henry Hudson) than a farmer. The statue was commissioned by Norstar Bank President Peter D. Kiernan as part of the park across Broadway from the then-newly renovated Union Station, which Norstar used as its headquarters until buyer Bank of America moved its employees out of the building in 2010. The statue still stands in Tricentennial Park on Broadway.

== History ==
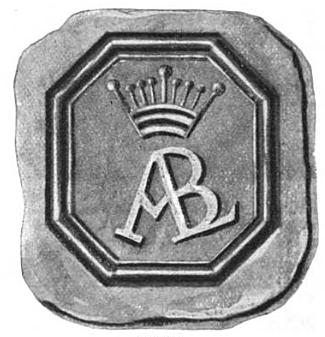
Figure 1: Albany's first seal, dating from 1686

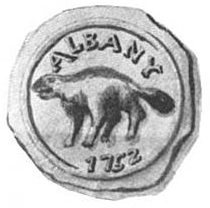
Figure 2: Albany's seal in 1752, including the beaver, year, and full name of city

Albany began as the Dutch fur-trading post Fort Orange in 1624. Around the fort grew the village of Beverwijck (English: Beaver District), (Note: Beverwijck has since been Anglicized to Beverwyck, not to be confused with the neighborhood in Albany.) which was incorporated in 1652. In 1664, the English sacked New Netherland and Beverwyck was renamed Albany in honor of the Duke of York and Duke of Albany (later James II of England). (Note: James Stuart (1633–1701), brother and successor of Charles II, was both the Duke of York and Duke of Albany before being crowned James II of England and James VII of Scotland in 1685. His title of Duke of York is the source of the name of the province of New York. Duke of Albany was a Scottish title given since 1398, generally to a younger son of the King of Scots. The name is ultimately derived from Alba, the Gaelic name for Scotland.)

When the city was incorporated by provincial governor Thomas Dongan in 1686 under the Dongan Charter, it was empowered to have its own seal:

The said Mayor, Aldermen and Commonalty of the City of Albany, and their successor shall and may forever hereafter, have one common seal to serve for the sealing of all and singular their affairs and business touching or concerning the said corporation. And it shall and may be lawful to and for the said Mayor, Aldermen and Commonalty of the said city of Albany, and their successors, as they shall see cause, to break, change, alter and new make their said common seal, and as often as to them shall seem convenient.

The first known use of the seal was on a deed from the city of Albany sold at auction. Signed by Albany's first mayor, Pieter Schuyler, the document was sealed with red wax, the design on which was an octagon with a monogram of the letters ALB in the center topped with a crown (see Figure 1). This document was found in 1886. This seal was again seen on a document from 1736, though that too was not found until 1886. The letters are presumed to be an abbreviation of the name of the city. However the meaning of the crown is unknown; it was noted for being "hardly a kingly crown, nor in shape like a coronet, the head attire of nobility".

Prior to 1752 (but after 1736), the seal had a beaver at center, with the letters "ALB" above it. This seal was replaced in 1752 with the abbreviation removed and replaced with "Albany" above the beaver and the year below as such:

Resolved and ordered by this Board—That the old seal of this corporation, now in the hands of the Mayor, be changed and altered, and that there be a new seal in its place, which new seal, being now produced to this board and approved of by them, the same is ordered to be lodged in the hands of our present clerk in his office for the use and behoof of this corporation, and that the present now new seal be henceforth our seal and called, deemed and esteemed the common seal of this corporation until it be altered and changed and the aforesaid former seal be null and void and dead in law to all intents and purposes whatsoever.

The seal from 1752 is shown in Figure 2. The beaver honored Albany's past as an important fur trading port. Adding to the history of this seal, one historian states, "[The seal] displays the beaver, but looking in the original, more like a drowned cat than the fat and sleek animal, it was intended to represent. Neither the resolution nor the records state why the change was made." In 1755 the original seal (Figure 1) was reinstated for use by the mayor in licensing businesses. So at this point the city had two seals, one corporate and one public. The earlier seal, however, was last seen in 1761 and the beaver continued as the sole city seal from then on.

The current seal was adopted in 1789 and first shows up in 1790, when Simeon De Witt, Albany's city surveyor, included the arms on his map of the city. An updated map from 1794 also includes the arms. Both versions include a full landscape in the upper portion of the shield including multiple beavers and trees, as opposed to just one beaver and tree in the current version. There is no documented reasoning for changing the seal from the beaver to the coat of arms, and the coat of arms itself "seems to [have] no record authority" making it in any way official.
