= Dirk Langendijk =

Dutch draughtsman, painter and etcher

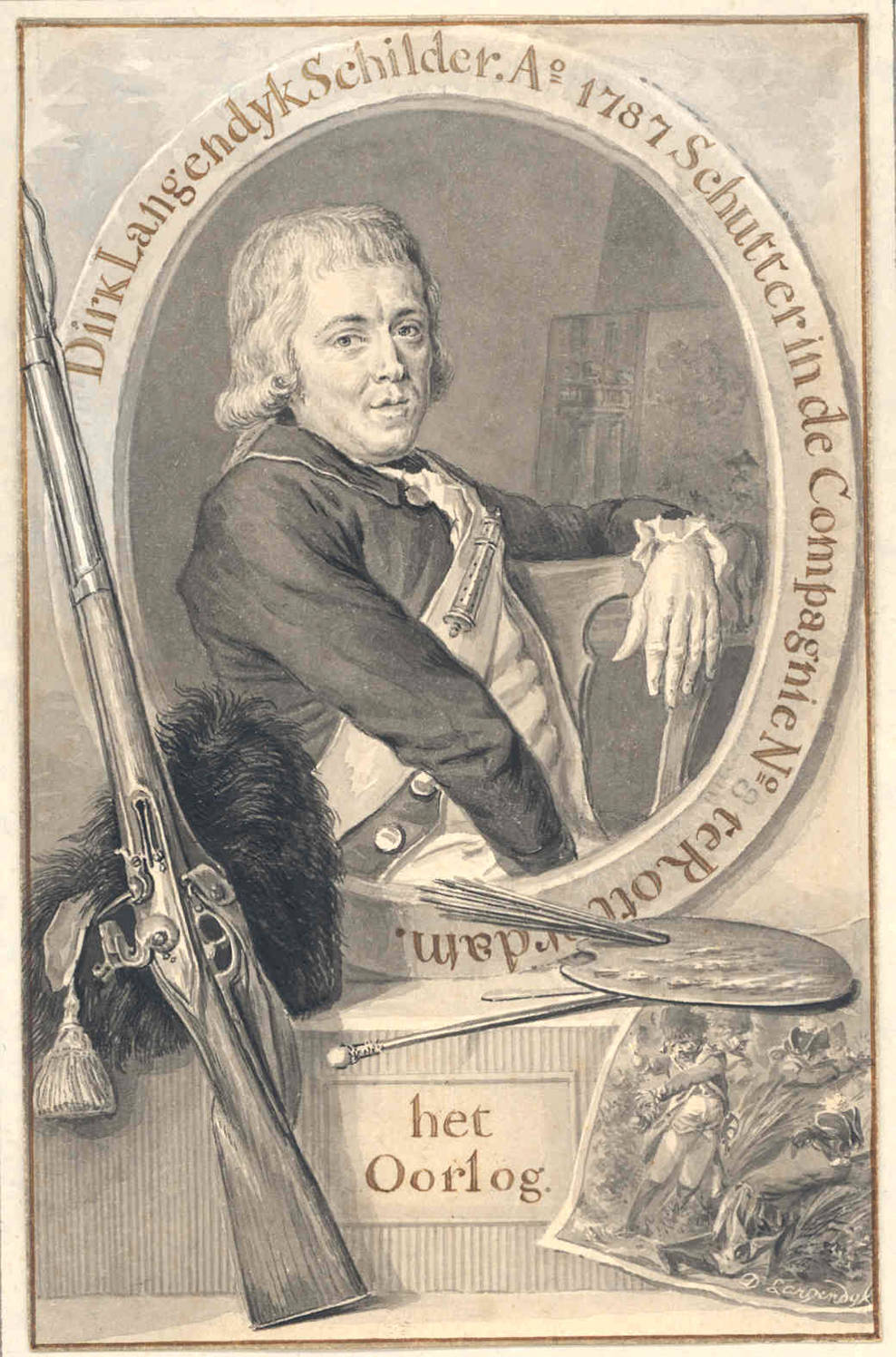
- Self-portrait, c. 1787
- Born: 8 March 1748; Rotterdam
- Died: 15 December 1805 (aged 57); Rotterdam

Dirk Langendijk (8 March 1748 – 15 December 1805) was a Dutch draughtsman, painter and etcher. He produced mainly depictions of land and sea battles and other military scenes from the Dutch Patriottentijd (circa 1780–1800) and the French Revolutionary and Napoleonic Wars (from 1792).

== Life ==
Born on the Bierhaven quay in the port of Rotterdam, he was the son of Hendrik Langendijk, who had come to Rotterdam from the village of Wijhe in Overijssel, and had been appointed as garbuleur by the Rotterdam chamber of the Dutch East India Company in 1772. A garbuleur was someone who removed dirt and dust from a cargo of spices, and also sorted spices by quality. Dirk's mother was Hendrik's second wife, Hendrina van der Kamp, who hailed from Arnhem.

Langendijk learned his trade from Dirck Anthonie Bisschop (1708–1758), a painter of interiors, coats of arms and coaches. He was unhappily married and sought comfort in narcotics use. He died in 1805, at a relatively young age. His son Jan Anthonie Langendijk (1780–1818) followed in his father's footsteps and became a draughtsman.

== Career ==
The Battle of Callantsoog, 27 August 1799 (1803)

As an artist, Langendijk quickly focused on military scenes, evidenced by his early sketches of horses and soldiers (1769–1777). He almost never portrayed individuals but almost exclusively depicted groups, especially soldiers, officers, and horses. He was much admired in his day for his depictions of horses in battle, and a number of contemporary artists copied his work, including his pupil Johannes Adriaansz. Bemme (1775–1841).

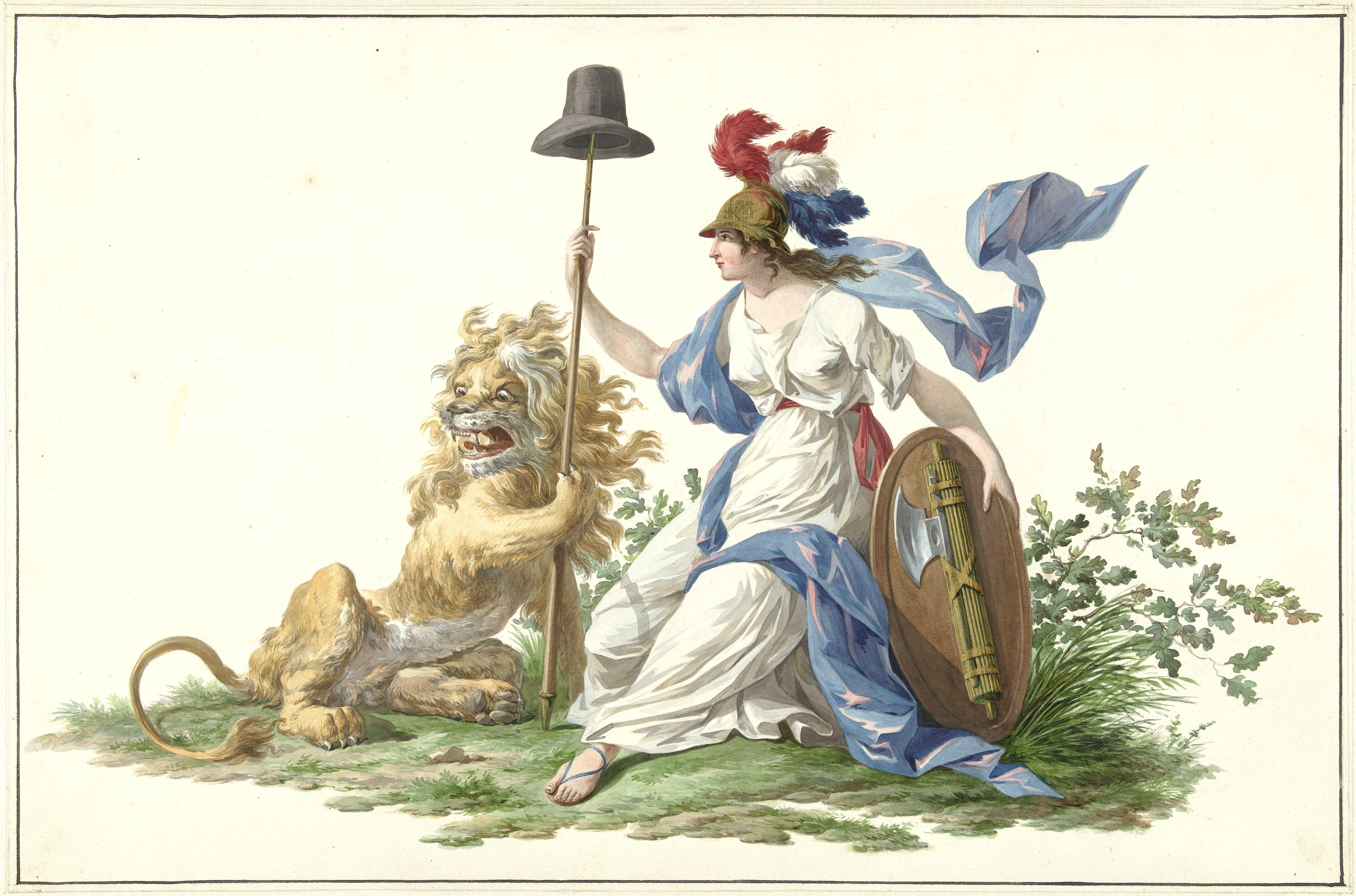
Batavian Republic jack (1796)

His only dated paintings were produced in the period 1771/72–1780. They show scenes from the lives of the landed gentry and soldiers, such as a painting from about 1774 of an army camp with soldiers and horses. This painting is now in the collection of the Museum Boijmans van Beuningen. In 1796, he designed the jack of the new Batavian flag. In 1799, he made a drawing of the landing at Callantsoog on 27 August by British troops during the Anglo-Russian invasion of Holland. Langedijk was most likely present at this event, as the painting carries the inscription ad vivum 1799 ("from the life 1799"). The drawing is now in the British National Maritime Museum. A watercolour version of the drawing was purchased by the Prince of Wales in 1803 and is now in the royal library at Windsor.

An undated Langendijk painting displays a scene from the raid on the Medway by Admiral Michiel de Ruyter in 1667. It gives a closeup view of the naval battle, with hand-to-hand combat taking place in the left foreground and an English ship on fire and keeling over in the centre of the painting. This work is now in the collection of the Brighton Museum & Art Gallery.

One of the few non-military subjects depicted by Langendijk was the fire that struck the windmill Spaarn en Wind on the Spaarne river near Haarlem. A group of people is watching the blaze, and a few men are crossing the Spaarne to help put out the fire. In another drawing, now at the Courtauld Gallery in London, we see ships in a storm near the Dutch coast. One of the ships has been beached and the local populace is busy looting the ships' cargo.

== Exhibitions ==
In 1953, the Rotterdam city archives held an exhibition of drawing and watercolour paintings by Langendijk, collaborator Christoffel Meijer and son Jan Anthonie Langendijk. Work by Langendijk was also included in the exhibition "Hartstochtelijk Verzameld – Beroemde Tekeningen in 18de-Eeuwse Hollandse Collecties" ("Passionately Collected – Famous Drawings in 18th-Century Collections") at the Teylers Museum in Haarlem in 2001 and the Institut Néerlandais in Paris in 2002.

== Sources ==
- H.C. Hazewingel, Dirk en Jan Anthonie Langendijk en Christoffel Meijer (Dutch)
- Artnet.com / The Grove Dictionary of Art: Langendijk, Dirk
- Lawrence Steigrad Fine Arts: Dirk Langendijk: The Windmill Spaarne en Wind on Fire
- National Maritime Museum
