= Thomas Michael Whalen III =

American politician

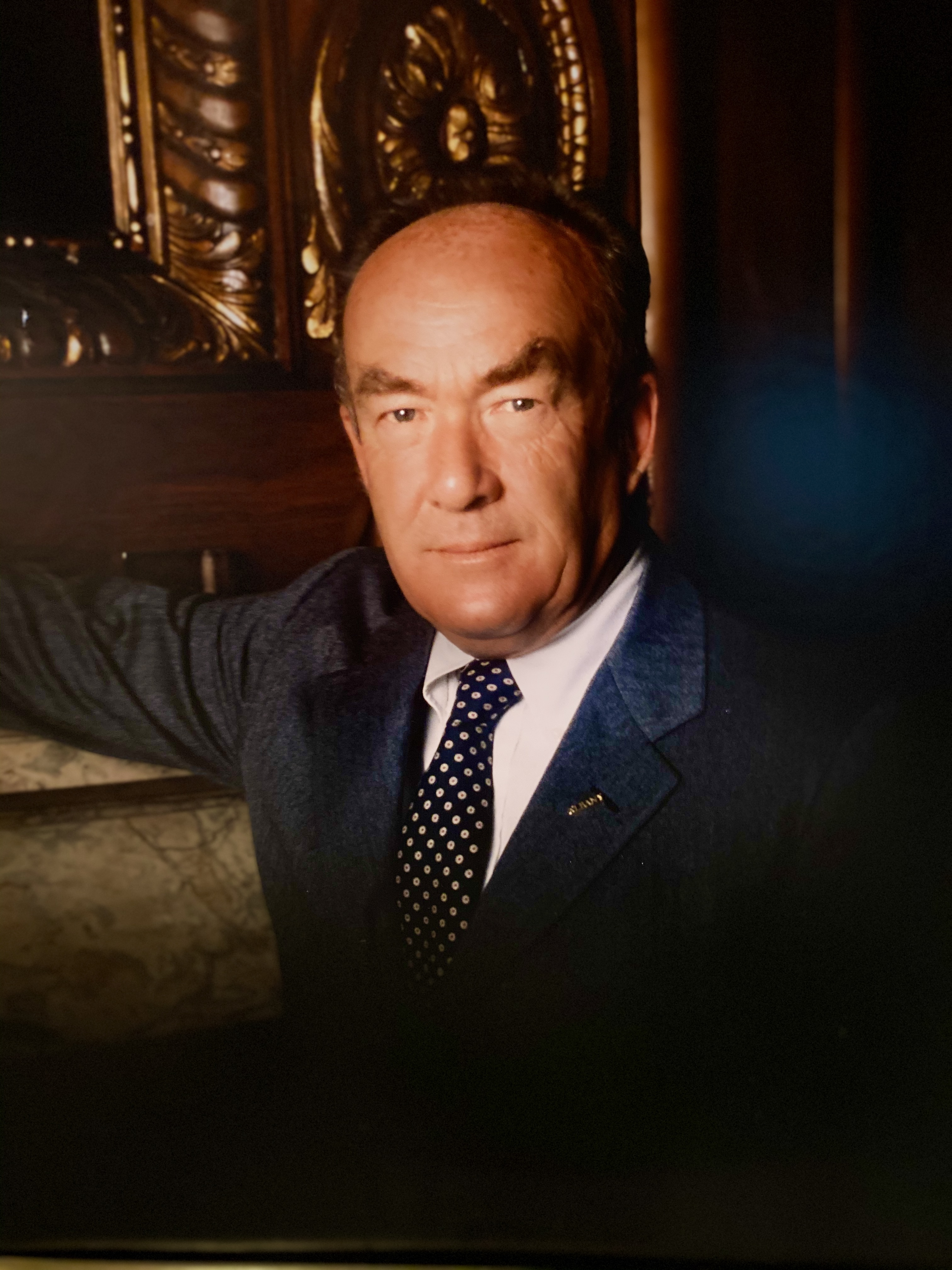

73rd Mayor of Albany
- In office May 28, 1983 – December 31, 1993
- Preceded by: Erastus Corning 2nd
- Succeeded by: Gerald Jennings

Personal details
- Born: January 6, 1934 Albany, New York, U.S.
- Died: March 4, 2002 (aged 68) Feura Bush, New York, U.S.
- Party: Democratic
- Spouse: Denis Marie O'Connor (m. 1960)
- Children: 5
- Education: Manhattan College; Albany Law School
- Profession: Attorney

Thomas Michael Whalen III, also known as Tom Whalen, (January 6, 1934 – March 4, 2002) was an American attorney and politician, and a three-term mayor of Albany, New York, serving from 1983 to 1993. A native of Albany, he graduated from Manhattan College and Albany Law School.

== Early life and education ==
Thomas Michael Whalen III was born to an ethnic Irish Catholic family in Albany in 1934. He attended Vincention Institute for elementary, middle and high school. He graduated from Manhattan College in 1955 and Albany Law School in 1958.

== Career ==
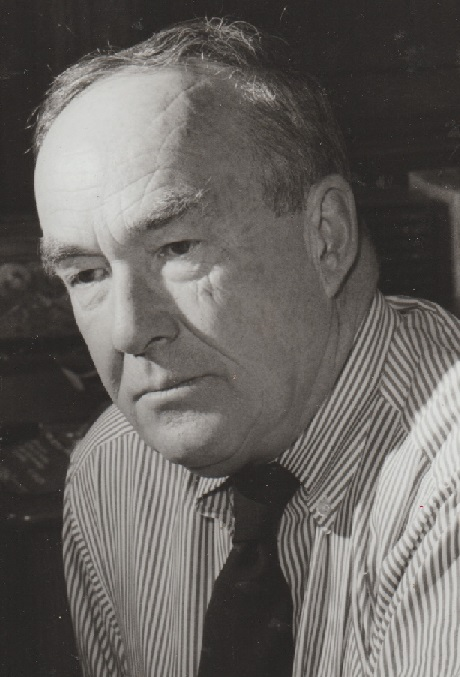
Whalen as mayor in 1993

After law school, Whalen joined the law firm of Cooper, Erving & Savage and went into private practice in Albany.

He became interested in politics, joining the Democratic Party. Whalen was elected as a city court judge and served from 1969 to 1975. He continue to take part in city government, including serving on the Albany Housing Authority and as chairman of the university council for the State University of New York at Albany.

In 1981, as part of Erastus Corning 2nd's "Team for the Future", he was picked as his successor, and nominated and elected as President of the Albany Common Council. Whalen's election to the Common Council's presidency put him in position to ascend to the Mayor's Office in City Hall.

Mayor Corning died in 1983 in Boston. In accordance with Albany's charter, Whalen, as Common Council President, ascended as Mayor. At that time, New York State Comptroller Ned Regan was preparing to impose a Financial Control Board over the City of Albany, which was struggling with debt due to a downturn in its economy and loss of jobs. Whalen quickly set about establishing proper financial controls so that Albany could maintain control over its own finances; in addition, he worked to strengthen the economy and attract new residents and businesses. By all accounts he was successful.

Whalen served as a delegate to the 1984 Democratic National Convention. His administration encouraged the city's year-long Tricentennial celebration together with its business community. Among the project was restoration of the historic carillon of Albany City Hall.

Whalen served the balance of Corning's 11th term, and was elected in his own right in 1985. He won a second full term in 1989. He is credited with a variety of reforms in city government, including reducing patronage and the reach of the political machine that Corning had ruled for more than four decades.

He retired from public office on December 31, 1993 after being recommended for the US federal bench by Senator Daniel Patrick Moynihan of New York. Mayor Whalen withdrew his name from consideration after waiting over a year for Bill Clinton to officially back his nomination, not an uncommon circumstance. He then returned to the practice of law and other endeavors, including teaching a government course to university students. He died in a car accident at the age of 68.

== Marriage and family ==
In 1960 he married Denis Marie O'Connor. They had five children together: Laura Whalen, who lives in Albany as an adult; and four sons, Thomas, of Clarksville; Mark, of New Salem; Matthew of Garden City; and Jon.

== Legacy ==
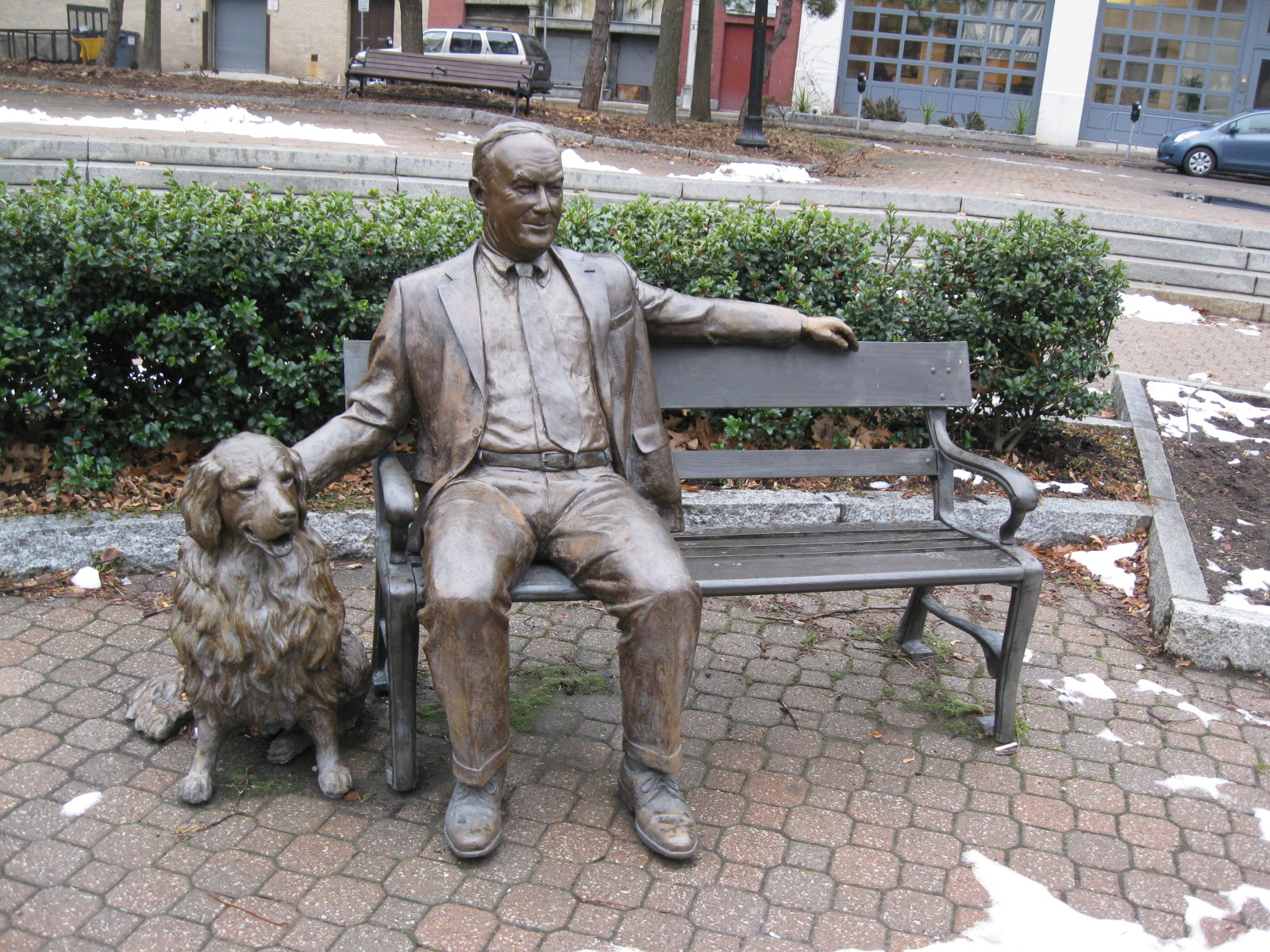
Statue of Whalen and his dog Finn McCool at Tricentennial Park in Albany

Whalen is credited with leading a broad revitalization of both the City of Albany and the Capital District through the 1980s and into the early 1990s. His tenure is noted for its focus on prudent financial and civil service reform, opening up city hall, and using the arts and the city park system as a catalyst for growth.

Whalen was involved in improving the city's image both domestically and worldwide. In 1991, he founded the Albany-Tula Alliance with Tula, then a city in the U.S.S.R., now Russia.

The city was designated an "All-American City" under his leadership, attained the highest possible bond rating from Moody's and hosted many successful downtown cultural events.

Whalen is remembered for his encouragement of renovation of historic architecture in the city and adaptive re-use, as well as encouraging new construction. He helped attract federal monies for such reinvestment, adding to the character of the city.

On the other hand, he opposed preservation of the Albany Pine Bush, an area of pine barrens on the outskirts of Albany, which he wanted developed for an office building. A small group of activists has worked to preserve this area, gaining cooperation of residents and officials of three towns for a Pine Bush Preserve Commission, founded in 1988, and sometimes fighting for protection through lawsuits.

The Irish Internship program at the New York State Assembly is named in his honor. In 2000, Whalen joined the staff at University College Cork. He decided to found an internship program for that college's students to go to the College of Saint Rose in Albany for experiential education in the American city, especially working with the state legislature. He died in a car accident in 2002, just as the first "Irish Interns" were set to arrive in Albany.

Whalen was eulogized at Albany Law, his alma mater. An award is granted by the Neighborhood Resource Center in his honor. The "Thomas M. Whalen III Foundation for Cultural Arts" was founded in his honor by friends and family. A memorial statue of him can be found in downtown Albany's Tricentennial Park.

== See also ==
- History of Albany, New York

Preceded by Erastus Corning II	Mayor of Albany, New York; 1983 – 1993	Succeeded by Gerald Jennings
