= Statenvlag =

1652–1795 flag of the Dutch Republic

- Other names: States Flag (Dutch: Statenvlag), Staatsche vlag
- Design: Three horizontal bands of red, white and blue

The Statenvlag ("States Flag") is the name of the flag of the States-General of the Dutch Republic, the red-white-blue tricolour flag replacing the older orange-white-blue Prince's Flag in the mid 17th century. The modern national flag of the Netherlands, whose exact colours were confirmed in 1937, is based on this historical flag. It also resembles the modern Flag of Luxembourg.

== History ==
The origin of the red-white-blue tricolour is not entirely clear; some sources suggest that it developed merely as a variant of orange-white-blue because the orange dye would tend to fade to red over time. However, there have also been suggestions to the effect that the red-white-blue flag might predate the introduction of the Prince's Flag in the 1570s. Thus, Muller (1862) suggested that the colours were taken from the coat of arms of the Bavarian house, the rulers of the county of Holland during 1354–1433, who used the Bavarian coat of arms quartered with the arms of the counts of Holland.

During the early part of the First Stadtholderless Period (1650–1672), the government of the Dutch Republic wanted to appease the republican government of the Commonwealth of England, and because the colour orange was associated with the House of Stuart, the orange-white-blue Prince's Flag was banned in 1652, replaced by the red-white-blue "States Flag". According to de Waard (1900), the Dutch navy between 1588 and 1630 always displayed the Prince's Flag, and after 1663 always the State's Flag, but both flag variants were in use during the period of 1630–1662. It appears that prior to 1664, the red-white-blue tricolour was commonly known as the "Flag of Holland" (Hollandsche Vlag). In 1664, the States of Zeeland complained about this, and a resolution of the States-General introduced the name "States Flag" (Statenvlag).

In the 1930s, the supporters of the NSB chose the orange-white-blue and the Prince's Flag as their symbol. Queen Wilhelmina in 1937 signed a Royal Decree that the colours red, white and blue are set as the official colours of the Dutch flag, partly as a signal directed at the NSB.

== The Statenvlag in paintings ==
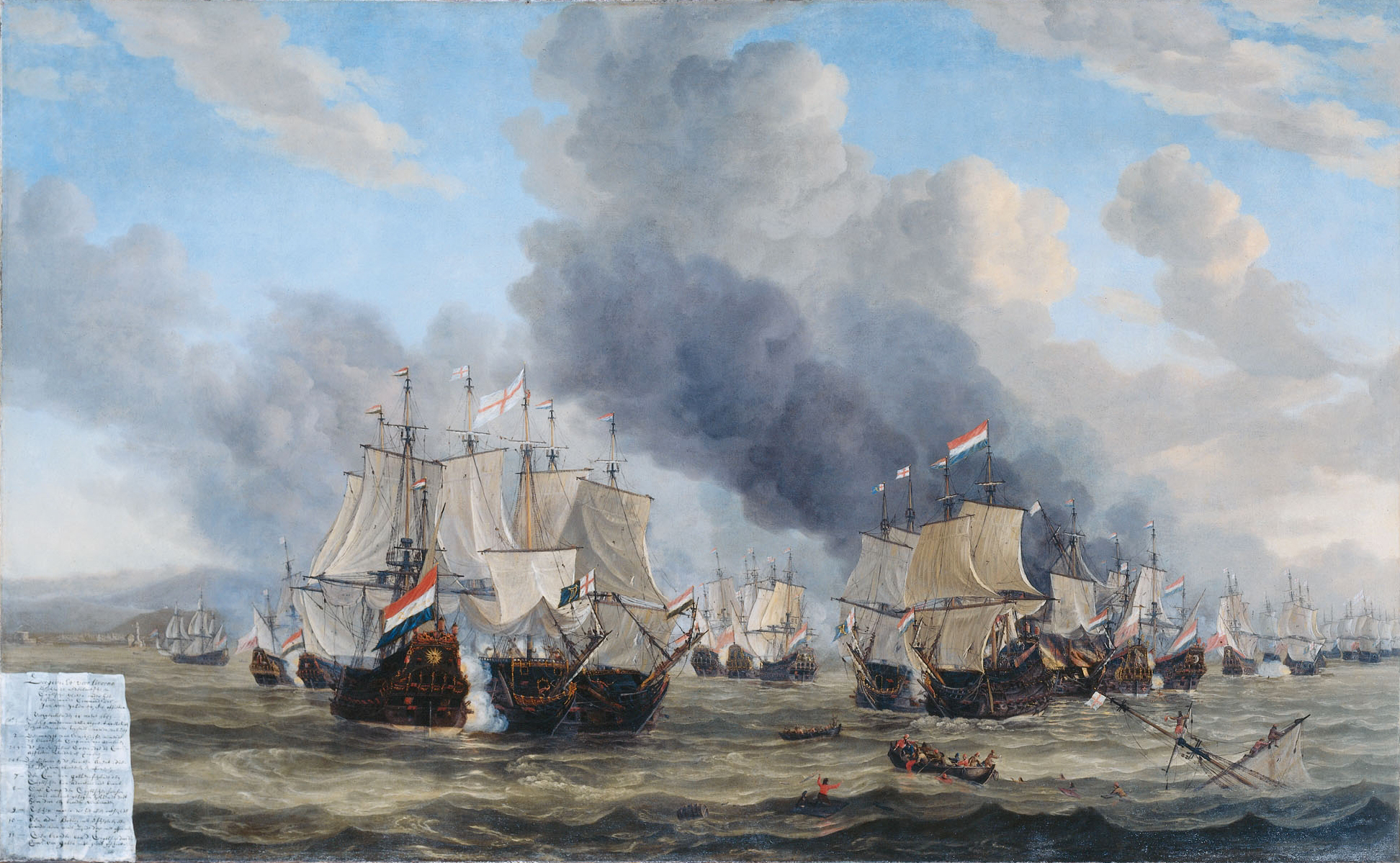
Reinier Nooms (1623–1664), Battle of Leghorn, 14 March 1653.

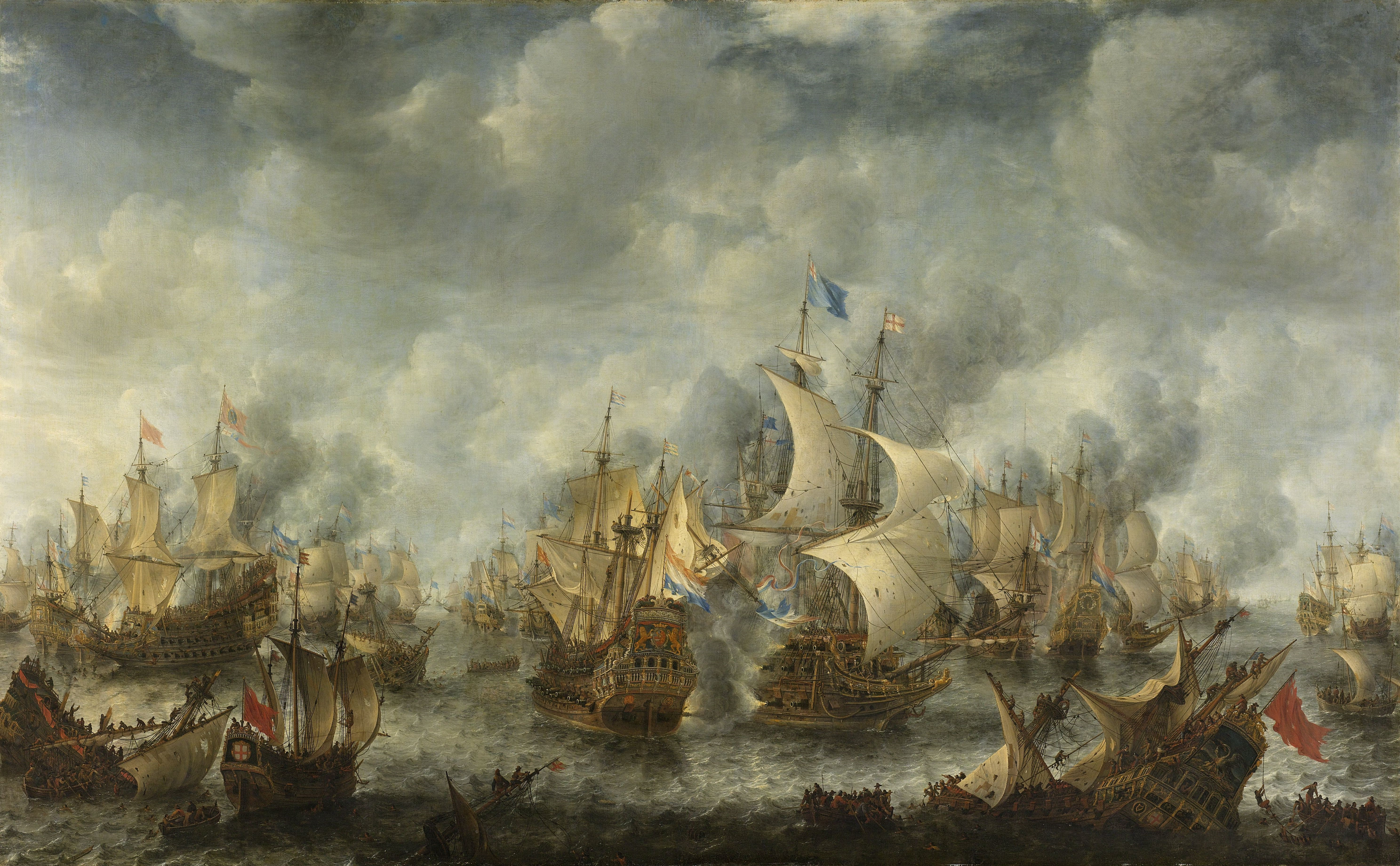
Jan Abrahamsz Beerstraaten (1622–1666), Battle of Scheveningen, 10 August 1653.

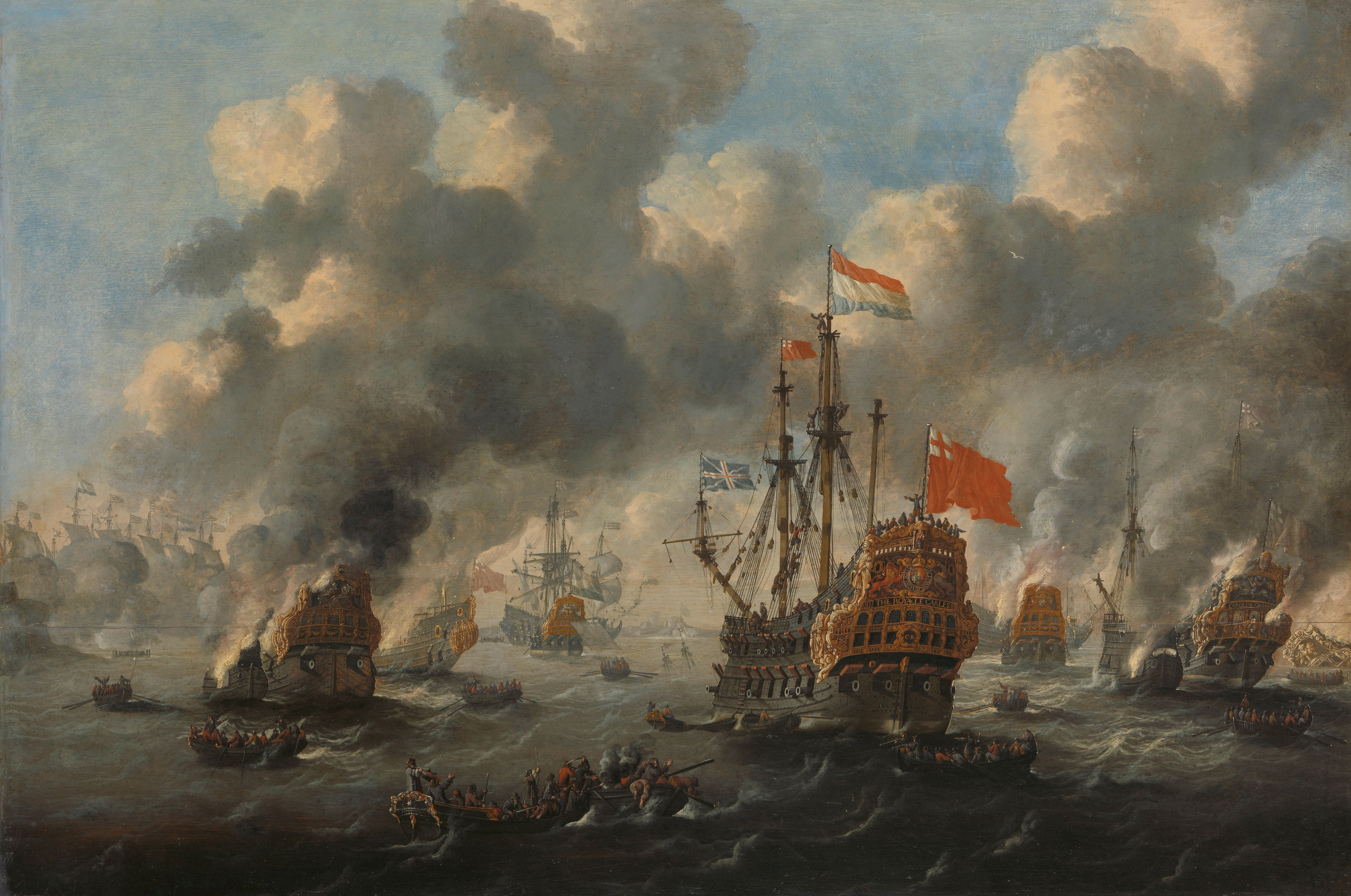
Peter van de Velde (1643–1714), Raid on the Medway, 20 June 1667.

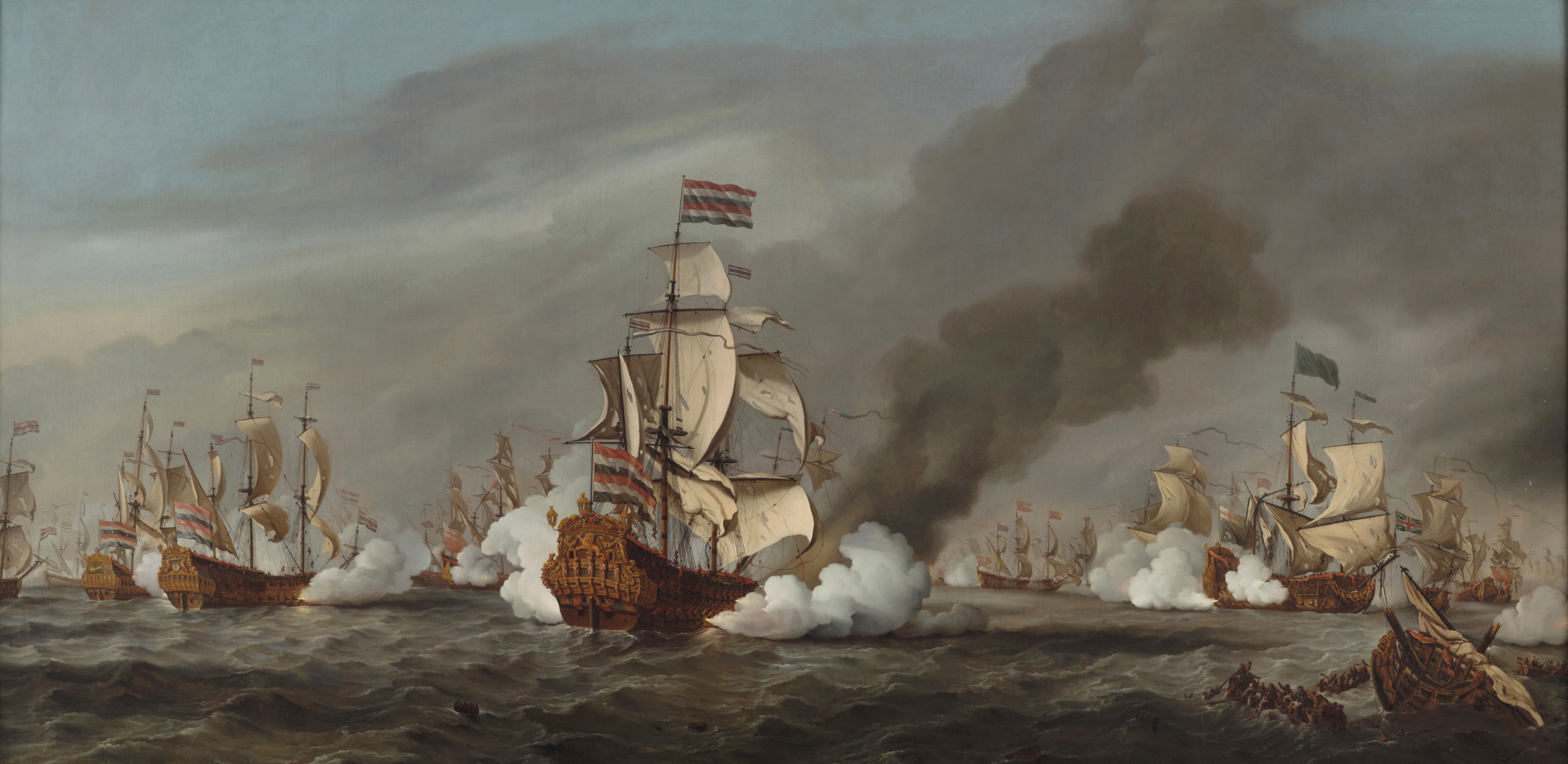
Willem van de Velde the Younger (1633–1707), Battle of Texel, 21 August 1673.
