= Tricentennial Park (Albany, New York) =

Park in Albany, New York, USA

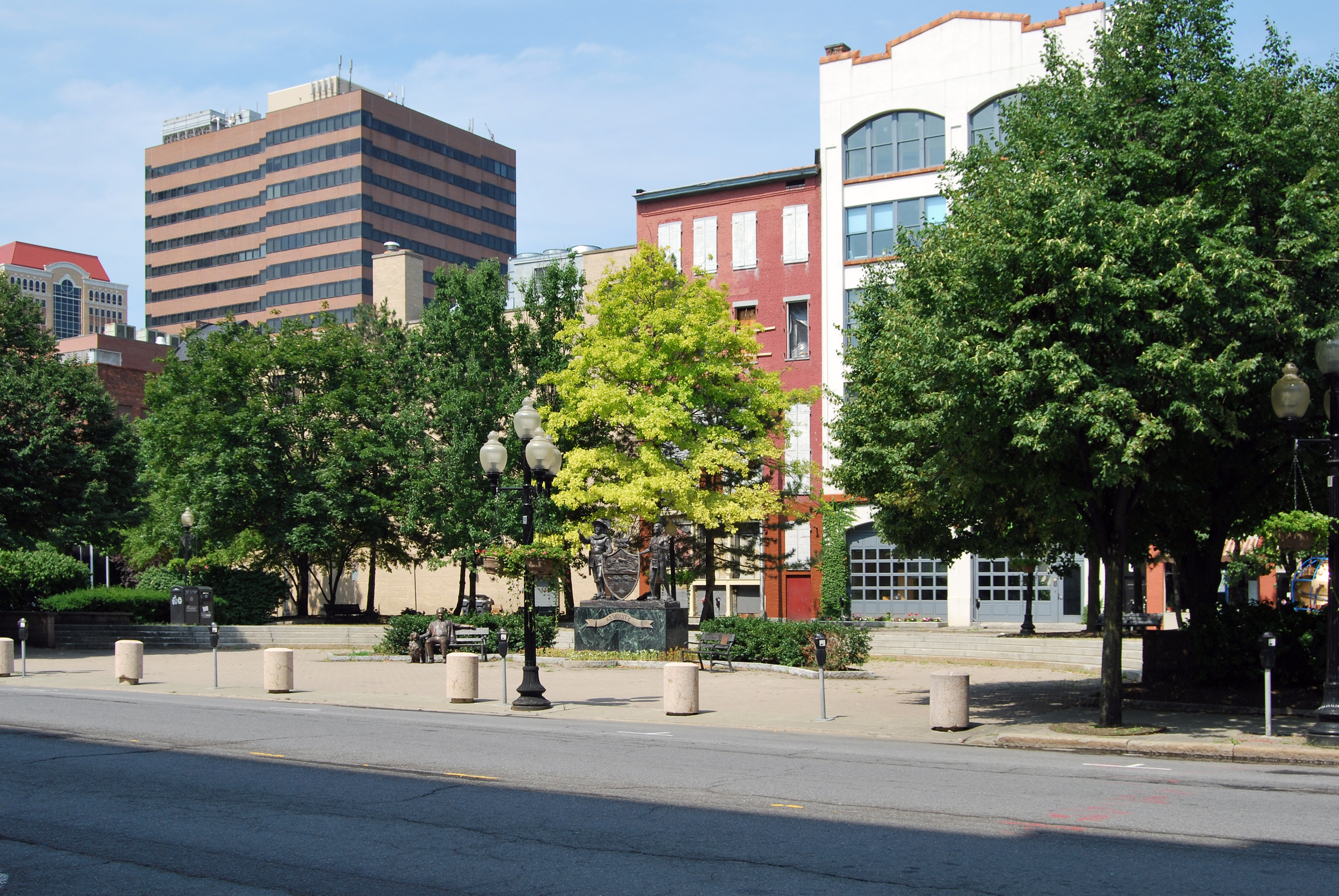
- Tricentennial Park as seen from across Broadway
- Interactive map of Tricentennial Park
- Type: Urban park
- Location: Albany, New York
- Coordinates: 42°39′5.83″N 73°45′0.09″W
- Created: 1986
- Operator: City of Albany

Tricentennial Park is an urban park in Albany, New York built to commemorate that city's three hundredth anniversary as an incorporated city and is the site of several statues and monuments. The park encompasses the entire block bounded by Broadway to the east, Columbia Street to the north, James Street to the west, and Steuben Street to the south. First proposed in 1914 it was built in 1986 as part of the tricentennial celebrations of Albany's incorporation as a city in association with the renovation of the Albany Union Station.

== History ==
A park was first proposed on this site in 1914 as part of architect Arnold W. Brunner and landscape architect Charles Downing Lay's master plan for the city as published under the name of Stvdies for Albany. It was intended to be a gateway for visitors to the city arriving by train at the Albany Union Station across the street.

The park was built in 1986 on a 150–car surface parking lot as part of the celebrations of Albany's 300th anniversary of becoming a city incorporated under the Dongan Charter. Originally Corning Park behind City Hall was to carry the Tricentennial Park name, but that was dropped in favor of dedicating it to Mayor Erastus Corning 2nd who had died in 1982. The park cost $378,000 at the time, only $2,000 over budget; with Norstar Bancorp paying for the statuary to be placed in the park. At the time, Norstar was renovating the Union Station across Broadway from the park into the bank's headquarters. A time capsule was placed in the park, to be opened in 2086.

The official opening of the park was delayed to coincide with the grand opening of Norstar's new headquarters at Union Station on September 19, 1986, which was renamed Norstar Plaza (now Kiernan Plaza). Fireworks, a laser show, and a performance by Up with People were among the highlights of the dedication. In attendance were Governor Mario Cuomo, Mayor Whalen, Norstar Bancorp President Peter Kiernan, and Pulitzer Prize-winning author William Kennedy.

Less than a year after the park's official opening the statue was defaced with the removal of the Native American's earring and the bending of his feather headdress. Credit for the vandalism was taken by a woman claiming to be representing the "Albany Tea Party", protesting property assessment increases.

== Time capsule ==
The time capsule placed in the park is a 100-pound (45 kg) box that is 1-foot (0.30 m) deep, 2 feet (0.61 m) wide, and 3 feet (0.91 m) long. The box was built, paid for, and designed by the Tebbutts family, owners of a funeral home in Albany since 1850. It consisted of a video tape of Mayor Thomas Whalen III and the chairman of the Tricentennial Committee, a book written by two 8th grade students about their daily life at Philip Livingston Middle School, a model of the Empire State Plaza constructed by students at Catholic Central High School in Troy, New York, along with various objects suggested by a write-in competition. Among the selected from the competition for inclusion was a pamphlet of the First Church in Albany, William Kennedy's novel O' Albany, and master development plans for the city to be compared to the realities on the ground at the opening of the capsule in 100 years.

== Monuments ==
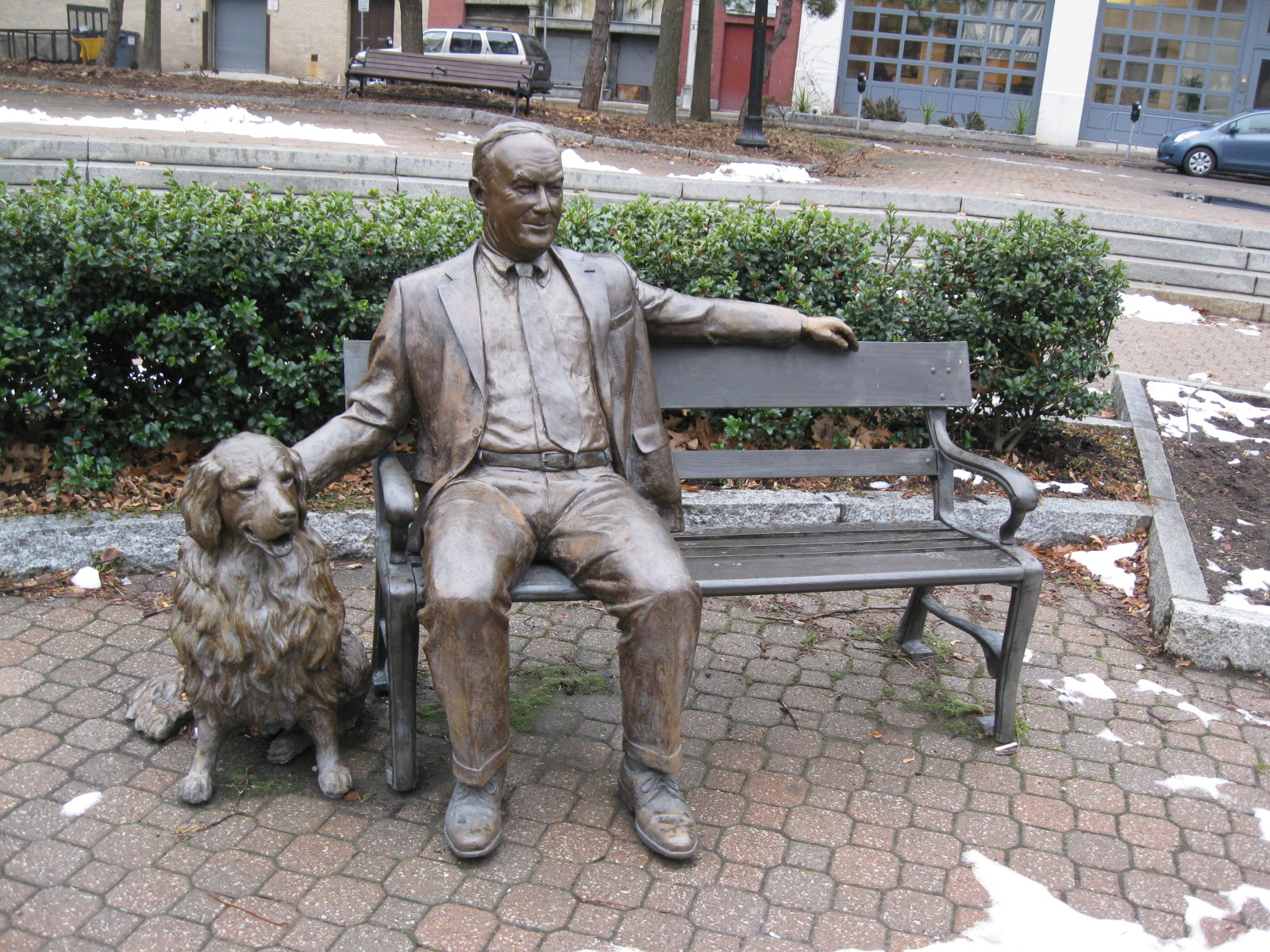
Memorial of Mayor Thomas Whalen III and his dog Finn McCool

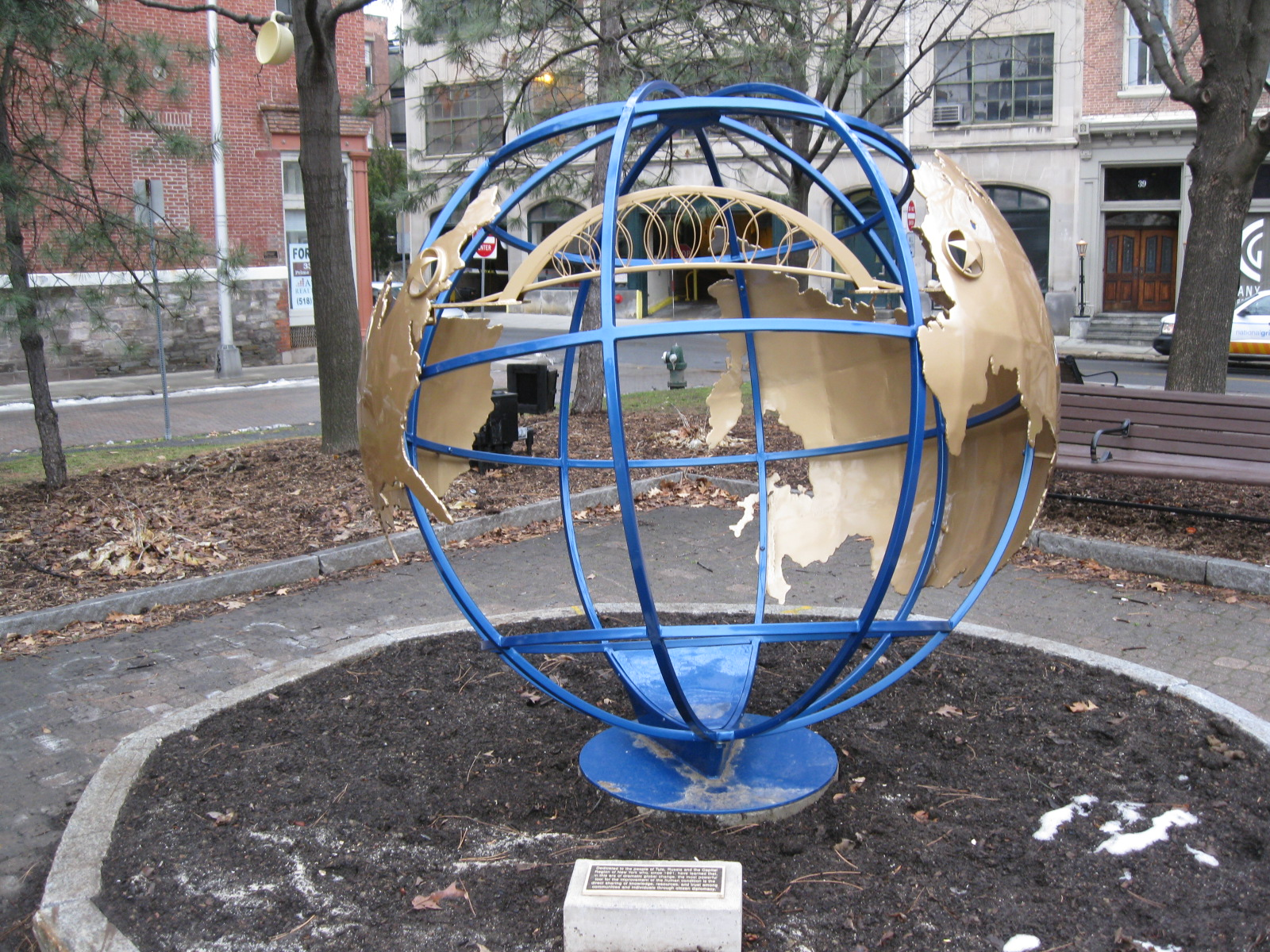
Albany–Tula, Russia commemorating the two sister city's 20th anniversary

The first monument to be placed in Tricentennial Park was the 6 foot, 4 inch (1.9 m) bronze replica of the official Albany city seal. The sculpture was designed and created by Hy Rosen, a cartoonist for the Albany Times Union, a regional daily newspaper. The statue, which is more detailed than the actual seal and diverges from the actual city seal in many aspects, such as replacing the generic sloop on the Hudson River to the more specific Half Moon of Henry Hudson fame, the generic tree became a birch, and the Native American's bow does not have a string.

In 2005 a bronze statue of Albany's 73rd mayor Thomas Whalen III (served 1983-93) and his Golden Retriever named Finn McCool was installed in the park. The statue is seated on a park bench with his right hand on top of the dog's head. Mayor Whalen is the only mayor of Albany to have a statue erected in his honor in the city. A statue for Mayor Corning was proposed and commissioned though it was never cast, a clay model of which sat in Mayor Whalen's office for many years. The statues of Mayor Whalen and his dog are life-size, and including the bench the monument is 16 feet (4.9 m) long and 15 feet (4.6 m) wide, it was designed by Hy Rosen.

A metal sculpture in the shape of a globe with representations of the United States (US) and Russia displayed on it, was dedicated in the park in 2011. Each country has a large star marking the spot of Albany in the US and of Tula in Russia, with a bridge linking the two. Designed by Steve Kroeger, the sculpture entitled Albany–Tula, Russia, commemorates the 20 year anniversary of the two as sister cities.

== Activities ==
Tricentennial Park hosts several special events, such as in 2006 the Knight in the Park chess tournament sponsored by the Eastern New York Chess Association. The Downtown Albany Business Improvement District (BID) hosts a Garden Party fundraiser in the park in connection with the annual Sculpture in the Streets event. The city puts on the annual September in the City Art Fair with art, crafts, and live music.
