= Triband (flag) =

Flag with three bands (bars or pales)

A vertical 2:3 triband.

A horizontal 2:3 triband.

A triband is a vexillological style which consists of three stripes arranged to form a flag. These stripes may be two or three colours, and may be charged with an emblem in the middle stripe. Some tribands are bicolour flags. Uncharged tribands include the flags of Russia, the Netherlands, Bulgaria, Italy, Germany and France. Charged tribands include the flags of Canada, Spain, Argentina and Mexico.

== Design ==
Outside of the name, which requires three bands of colour, there are no other requirements for what a triband must look like, so there are many flags that look very different from each other but are all considered tribands.

Some triband flags (e.g. those of Russia, Germany, Bulgaria and the Netherlands) have their stripes positioned horizontally, while others (e.g. those of France, Italy, Ivory Coast and Peru) position the stripes vertically. Often, the stripes on a triband are of equal length and width, though this is not always the case, as can be seen in the flags of Laos, Spain and Canada. Symbols on tribands may be seals, such as on the Belizean flag, or any manner of emblems of significance to the area the flag represents, such as in the flags of Argentina, Guatemala, Lebanon and Mexico.

== Bicolour and tricolour ==
The first tricolour flag, called the Prince's Flag, is the precursor of the red-white-blue Statenvlag: the modern flags of the Netherlands, which inspired many other red-white-blue tricolour flags due to its association with republicanism and liberty.

The flag of Russia, an example of a horizontal tricolour flag

The flag of France, an example of a vertical tricolour flag

The flag of Canada, an example of a charged vertical bicolour flag

The flag of Argentina, an example of a charged horizontal bicolour flag

The flag of Mexico, an example of a charged vertical tricolour flag

=== Bicolor ===
A bicolour (BE) or bicolor (AE) is a type of triband design that features two colors instead of three. Unlike the tricolour, which features three colors, the bicolour triband features two bars of the same color either in the left and right or at the top and bottom.

=== Tricolor ===
A tricolour (BE) or tricolor (AE) is a type of triband design which originated in the 16th century as a symbol of republicanism, liberty, or revolution. The oldest tricolour flag originates from the Netherlands, whose successor's design later inspired the French and Russian flags.

The flags of France, Italy, Romania, Mexico, Ireland and Paraguay were all adopted with the formation of an independent republic in the period of the French Revolution to the Revolutions of 1848, with the exception of the Irish tricolour, which dates from 1848 but was not popularised until the Easter Rising in 1916 and adopted in 1919.

=== History of tricolour ===
The first association of the tricolour with republicanism is the orange-white-blue design of the Prince's Flag (Prinsenvlag, precursor of the flags of the Netherlands), first depicted in 1575 and used by William I of Orange-Nassau in the Eighty Years' War, establishing the independence of the Dutch Republic from the Spanish Empire. Its red-white-blue successor is the oldest tricolour flag still in use. The flag of the Netherlands inspired both the French and Russian flags, which in turn further inspired many tricolour flags in other countries.

Though not the first tricolour flag, one of the most famous, known as Le Tricolore, is the blue, white and red (whence also called Le Bleu-Blanc-Rouge) flag of France adopted in 1790 during the French Revolution. Based on a 1789 design of the Cockade of France, it was easy to construct and also stood in a visual opposition to complicated royal banners of the Ancien Regime.

With the formation of French client republics after 1795, the revolutionary tricolour was exported and adopted more widely in Europe, by the Republic of Alba 1796 (red-blue-yellow), Cisalpine Republic 1797 (Transpadane Republic, green-white-red), Cisrhenian Republic 1797 (green-white-red), Anconine Republic 1797 (blue-yellow-red), Roman Republic 1798 (black-white-red), Helvetic Republic 1798 (green-red-yellow; canton of Neuchatel 1848), Parthenopean Republic 1799 (blue-yellow-red), and Principality of Lucca and Piombino 1805 (blue-white-red). Thus providing the format for many of modern Europe's national flags, from the flag of Italy, to the flags of Germany, Ireland, Belgium, Romania, Bulgaria, Moldova, and others around the world such as the flags of India, Cameroon, Canada, Chad, Ivory Coast, Gabon, Guinea, Mali, and Nigeria.

The green-white-red tricolour remained a symbol of republicanism throughout the 19th century and was adopted as a national flag by a number of states following the Revolutions of 1848. It was also adopted by the Kingdom of Sardinia (inherited by the Kingdom of Italy 1861).

The flag of Germany (black-red-gold) originates from the uniform colours of the Lützow Free Corps during the Napoleonic Wars, which contained volunteers from many German states and became famous through propaganda. Prominent veterans and later students became the core of the republican movement of early 1800s which adopted the colours. At the time the flag was known as Dreifarb, a German calque of Tricolore. It was a symbol of opposition against the German Kleinstaaterei and the desire for German Unification. It was at first illegal in the German Confederation, but was adopted as the national flag at the Frankfurt Parliament of 1848/9. The flag of Belgium was introduced in a similar context, in 1831, its colours taken from the flag used in the Brabant Revolution of 1789. The first national flag of the New World inspired by this symbolism was the flag of Mexico, adopted when the First Mexican Empire gained independence from Spain in 1821.

After 1848, the young republican nation states continued to pick triband designs, but now more prevalently expressing the sentiment of nationalism or ethnic identity than anti-monarchism, the flag of Hungary (1848), the flag of Romania (1848), the flag of Ireland (1848), the flag of Estonia (1880s), the flag of Lithuania (1905), and the flag of Armenia (1918). By contrast, the flag of Russia was adopted by the Tsardom of Russia in the late 17th century and while it may or may not have been inspired by the Dutch tricolour, it never had any republican implications; likewise the triband flag of Iran was adopted by the Qajar empire in 1905 and never had any republican implications either.

The political ideology of the unification of an ethnic nation state associated with tricolour flags since the 19th century has resulted in the design of new "tricolours" expressing specific nationalisms in the 20th century, the Pan-African colours adopted in the 1920s for Pan-Africanism, chosen in numerous African flags during decolonisation (green-yellow-red, taken from the triband design used by the Solomonic dynasty for the Ethiopian Empire since 1897). The Pan-Arab colours adopted in Arab nationalism 1916 are a comparable concept, even though they combine four, not three, colours. Also in the 20th century, Pan-Iranian colours for Iranian nationalism and Pan-Slavic colours for Slavic nationalism were adopted based on the triband design of the flags used during the 19th century by the Qajar dynasty and the Russian Empire, respectively.

During the brief Second Spanish Republic, a red-yellow-purple tricolour was adopted as its official flag. Today, it is still used by Spanish republicans.

The Indian independence movement in 1931 also adopted a tricolour (loan-translated as Hindi, तिरंगा Tiraṅgā) in the traditional symbolism of "national unification" and republican "self-rule" (Purna Swaraj), adopted as the flag of the India in 1947.

In 1999, a red, green, and blue tricolour was proposed as the Flag of Mars. The design symbolises liberty, and also the terraforming of Mars by humanity from a red planet to a green one, and eventually an Earth-like blue one.

== Gallery ==
The flag of Afghanistan (2013–2021), a charged vertical triband.

Variant flag of the Republic of Alba (1796), a simple horizontal triband.

The flag of Andorra, a charged vertical triband.

The flag of Argentina, a charged horizontal triband.

The flag of Armenia, a simple horizontal triband.

The flag of Austria, a simple horizontal triband.

The flag of Azerbaijan, a charged horizontal triband.

The flag of Barbados, a charged vertical triband.

The flag of Belgium, a simple vertical triband.

The flag of Belize, a charged horizontal triband.

The bisexual pride flag, a simple horizontal triband.

The flag of Bolivia, a charged horizontal triband.

The flag of Bulgaria, a simple horizontal triband.

The flag of Cambodia, a charged horizontal triband.

The flag of Cameroon, a charged vertical triband.

The flag of Canada, a charged vertical triband.

The flag of Chad, a simple vertical triband.

The flag of Colombia, a simple horizontal triband.

The flag of Croatia, a charged horizontal triband.

The flag of Ecuador, a charged horizontal triband.

The flag of Egypt, a charged horizontal triband.

The flag of El Salvador, a charged horizontal triband.

The flag of Estonia, a simple horizontal triband.

The flag of Ethiopia, a charged horizontal triband.

The flag of France, a simple vertical triband.

The flag of Gabon, a simple horizontal triband.

The genderqueer pride flag, a simple horizontal triband.

The flag of Germany, a simple horizontal triband.

The flag of Ghana, a charged horizontal triband.

The flag of Guatemala, a charged vertical triband.

The flag of Guinea, a simple vertical triband.

The flag of Honduras, a charged horizontal triband.

The flag of Hungary, a simple horizontal triband.

The flag of India, a charged horizontal triband.

The flag of Iran, a charged horizontal triband.

The flag of Iraq, a charged horizontal triband.

The flag of Ireland, a simple vertical triband.

The flag of Italy, a simple vertical triband.

The flag of Ivory Coast, a simple vertical triband.

The flag of Laos, a charged horizontal triband.

The flag of Latvia, a simple horizontal triband.

The flag of Lebanon, a charged horizontal triband.

The flag of Lesotho, a charged horizontal triband.

The flag of Libya, a charged horizontal triband.

The flag of Lithuania, a simple horizontal triband.

The flag of Luxembourg, a simple horizontal triband.

The flag of Malawi, a charged horizontal triband.

The flag of Mali, a simple vertical triband.

The flag of Mauritania, a charged horizontal triband.

The maverique pride flag, a simple horizontal triband.

The flag of Mexico, a charged vertical triband.

The flag of Moldova, a charged vertical triband.

The flag of Mongolia, a charged vertical triband.

The flag of Myanmar, a charged horizontal triband.

The flag of Nauru, a charged horizontal triband.

The flag of the Netherlands, a simple horizontal triband.

The flag of Nicaragua, a charged horizontal triband.

The flag of Niger, a charged horizontal triband.

The flag of Nigeria, a simple vertical triband.

The Pan-African flag, a simple horizontal triband.

The pansexual flag, a simple horizontal triband.

The flag of Paraguay (observe), a charged horizontal triband.

The flag of Paraguay (reverse), a charged horizontal triband.

The Flag of Peru, a simple vertical triband.

The polyamory pride flag (original 1995 design by Jim Evans), a charged horizontal triband.

The polysexual pride flag, a simple horizontal triband.

The flag of the Republic of the Congo, a simple diagonal triband.

The flag of Romania, a simple vertical triband.

The flag of Russia, a simple horizontal triband.

The flag of Rwanda, a charged horizontal triband.

The flag of Saint Vincent and the Grenadines, a charged vertical triband.

The flag of Senegal, a charged vertical triband.

The flag of Serbia, a charged horizontal triband.

The flag of Sierra Leone, a simple horizontal triband.

The flag of Slovakia, a charged horizontal triband.

The flag of Slovenia, a charged horizontal triband.

The flag of Somaliland, a charged horizontal triband.

The flag of Spain, a charged horizontal triband.

The Statenvlag, a simple horizontal triband.

The flag of Syria (previously the flag of the Syrian opposition to Bashar al-Assad), a charged horizontal triband.

The flag of Tajikistan, a charged horizontal triband.

The flag of Transnistria, a charged horizontal triband.

The state flag of Venezuela, a charged horizontal triband.

The flag of Yemen, a simple horizontal triband.

== See also ==
- Flag families
- List of flags by design
- List of national flags by design
- Gallery of sovereign state flags
- Gallery of flags of dependent territories
- Fin flash on military aircraft, sometimes in a "tricolour" form
