= Prince's Flag =

1570s–1652 flag of the Netherlands

Prinsenvlag
- Other names: Prince's Flag (Dutch: prinsenvlag), Oranje-blanje-bleu
- Relinquished: 1795 (outlawed)
- Design: Three horizontal bands of orange, white and blue
- Designed by: William the Silent

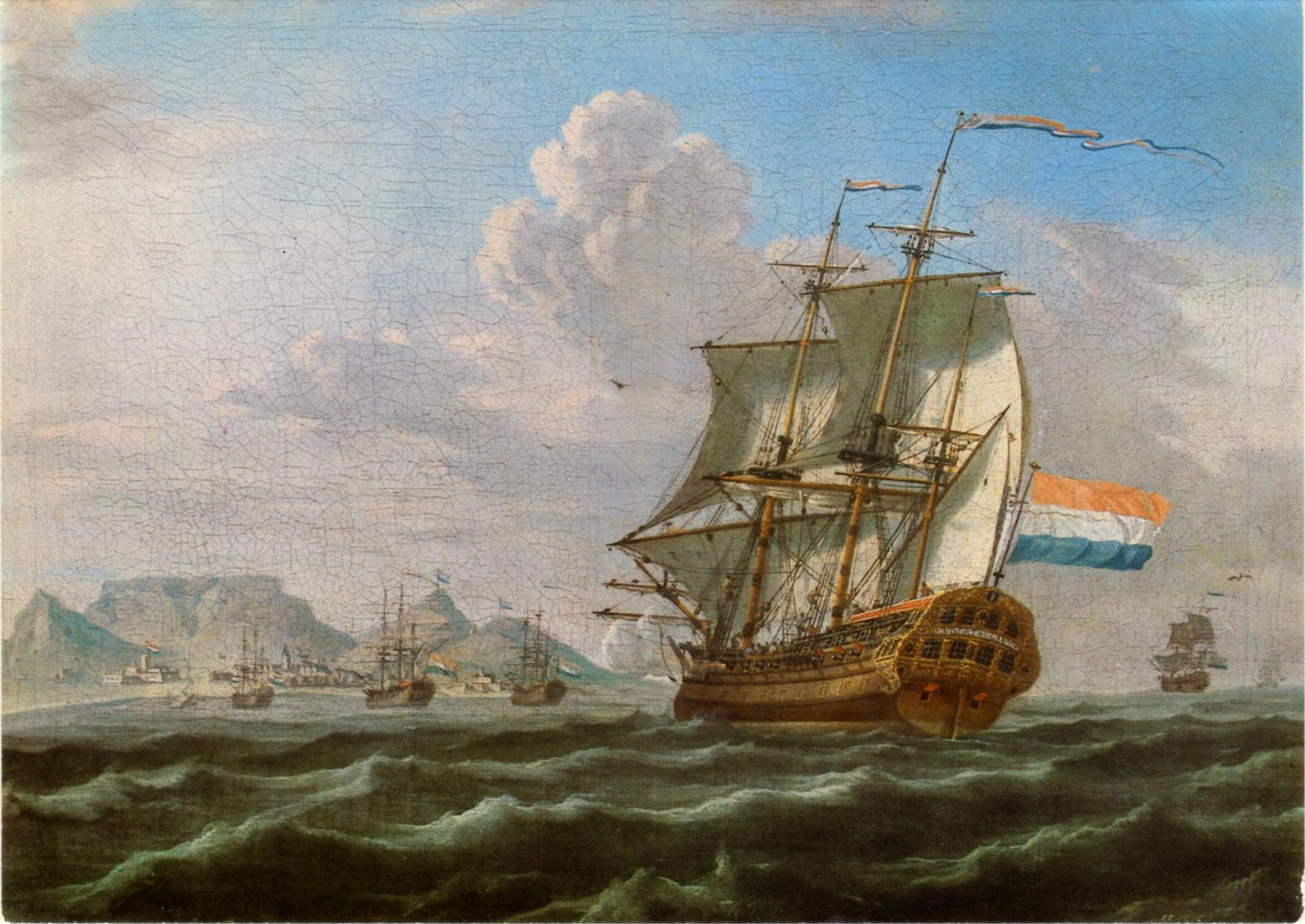
Noord-Nieuwland of the Dutch East India Company in Table Bay (1762) flying the Prince's flag

The Prince's Flag (Dutch: prinsenvlag) is a tricolour Dutch flag, first used in the Dutch Revolt during the late 16th century.

The Prince's Flag is based on the flag of William the Silent, Prince of Orange. The colours are orange, white and blue. On the basis of the French names of these colours, orange-blanc-bleu, the flag is also referred to by the Dutch rhymes oranje-blanje-bleu and ranje-blanje-bleu.

This flag became somewhat controversial in the Netherlands due to its usage by the pro-Nazi NSB in the years before and during World War II. The flag is now often used in the Netherlands by far right activists and in historical re-enactment.

== History ==
The colours orange, white and blue (Dutch: Oranje, Wit, Blauw or Oranje, Blanje, Bleu, from French Orange, Blanche, Bleu) are associated with William Prince of Orange (1533–1584). William is reported to have used these colours as early as 1577, as part of his procession entering Ghent. Jacob Duym also reports that in the siege of Leiden in 1574, the Dutch officers wore orange-white-blue brassards. From this, Rey (1837) concludes that the combination of orange-white-blue was certainly used by the Prince of Orange in the 1570s. The first reference to a naval flag in these colours dates to 1587, when the Admiralty of Zeeland ordered these flags to fly on their warships. The naval flag was used by the Watergeuzen (Gueux de mer, "Sea Beggars"), the pro-Dutch privateers during the Dutch Revolt. According to de Waard (1900), the Dutch navy between 1588 and 1630 always displayed the Prince's Flag, and after 1663 always the red-white-blue Statenvlag (but the light blue rather than the darker blue of the flags of the Kingdom of Holland and the Netherlands). The latter was introduced gradually during the 1630s to 1650s, and named "States' Flag" in 1664.

During the 17th century the Prince's Flag was hoisted on the Castle of Good Hope and saluted by incoming ships. The orange-white-blue flag formed the basis for the South African flag of 1928. It is also the basis for the flags of New York City and Albany, New York. After the republican Patriots, aided by the French, seized control over the Netherlands in 1795, the Prince's Flag was forbidden and the red-white-blue flag became the only official flag in order to dissociate from the House of Orange, to the content of the French, analogous as they were to their own tricolour, chosen just a few months earlier. In the following period of the Kingdom of Holland, there was also no place for Orange and the Bonapartist King Louis I chose red.

In 1813, when the French were expelled and the Netherlands regained its independence, the Prince of Orange returned to the country from England. The Prince's Flag saw a short revival; to demonstrate the attachment of the people to the House of Orange, both this flag and the red-white-blue flag fluttered on the roofs. In the same year, for the first time, the red-white-blue flag was flown with an orange pennant, which has remained the custom in the Netherlands. Whether the Prince's Flag or the red-white-blue flag should be the national flag was left undecided, although the Prince of Orange, later King William I, preferred the latter.

In the 1930s, the supporters of the National Socialist Movement in the Netherlands (NSB) chose the orange-white-blue and the Prince's Flag as their symbol. Queen Wilhelmina in 1937 signed a Royal Decree that the colours red, white and blue are set as the official colours of the Dutch flag.

== Usage ==
The Prince's flag was raised from the old Matthias church tower in Warmond in 2013 as part of the celebrations of the 200th anniversary of the Kingdom of the Netherlands.

The flag is also used as a symbol of the Greater Netherlands and Dutch pan-nationalist movements. It is frequently used by extreme right-wing groups such as the Dutch People's Union (NVU) and Voorpost, as well as the (now defunct) Nationalist People's Movement (NVB).

In 2011, two members of parliament for the Party for Freedom (PVV) had the Prince's flag hanging in their offices in the parliament's building. When this was received with scrutiny, the flags were removed. Former Dutch MP Wim Kortenoeven said he was perturbed by the negative connotations the flag carries as he believes the flag was "hijacked" by the NSB. At a PVV protest on 21 September 2013 in The Hague, several attendants were carrying Prince's flags. When Geert Wilders was speaking in House of Representatives the same week, Alexander Pechtold referred to the flags as 'NSB-flags', to which Wilders called Pechtold a "sad, measly, hypocritical little man." In protest of Pechtold's remark, at least five PVV members of the House of Representatives, Martin Bosma, Reinette Klever, Machiel de Graaf, Harm Beertema and Barry Madlener wore a Prince's flag lapel pin.

== Legacy ==
The Prince's Flag served as the basis for the flag of the Union of South Africa. This flag was adopted in 1928 and was inspired by the former Dutch flag. In the white part of the flag are the flags of (left to right) the United Kingdom, the Orange Free State and Transvaal, representing the Union's British colonial and republican predecessor states. In 1994, the flag was replaced by the post-apartheid flag of South Africa. In 2004, the Afrikaner town of Orania adopted a new flag based on the colours of the Prince's Flag. The flag is divided vertically (symbolizing a fresh beginning) with the white stripe replaced by a picture of a boy rolling up his sleeves (symbolizing going to work).

As a consequence of its beginnings as the Dutch colony of New Netherland, several places in New York State and New Jersey use variants of the Prinsenvlag as their official flags. These places include New York City, Jersey City, the Bronx, Albany, and Nassau County. The blue and orange color scheme is also used by several of New York's professional sports teams, including the Knicks, Mets, Islanders, and New York City FC.

Variant on the Prince's flag

Naval jack Brielse Geus

Prinsenvlag variant

Prinsenvlag variant

Statenvlag by Peter Fobs

Flag of the village of Hoek, Zeeland, Netherlands

Flag of South Africa (1928–1994)

Former flag of the State President of South Africa (1984–1994)

Flag of the Orange Free State

Flag of Orania

Flag of the former Kavangoland, South West Africa

Flag of New York City

Flag of the Bronx, New York City

Flag of the Borough of Manhattan, New York City

Flag of Albany, New York

Flag of Schenectady County, New York

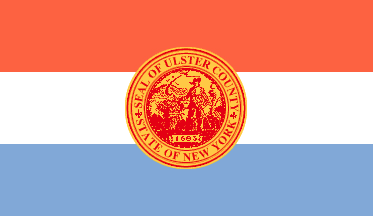
Flag of Ulster County, New York

Flag of Westchester County, New York

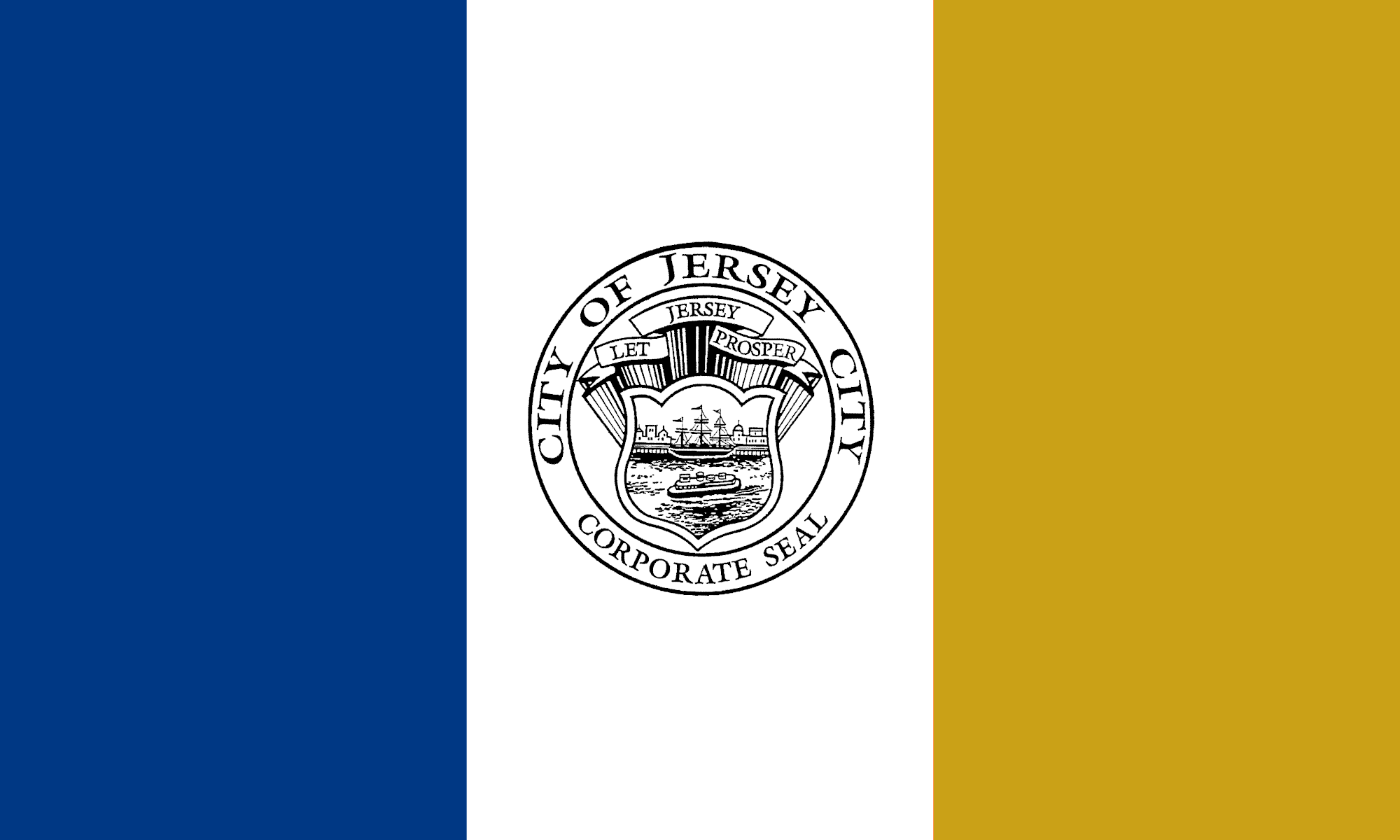
Flag of Jersey City, New Jersey

Flag of Hofstra University

Flag of the Netherlands Coast Guard

Flag of the Royal Netherlands Navy

Flag of the Royal Netherlands Army

Flag of the Royal Netherlands Air Force

Flag of the Royal Marechaussee

Flag of National Socialist Movement in the Netherlands with coat of arms bearing the Prince's Flag

Alternate flag of National Socialist Movement in the Netherlands

Flag of the Afrikaner Volksfront

Flag of Vlaamsch Nationaal Verbond

Flag of Verdinaso

== See also ==
- Statenvlag
- Other monarchical flags used by right-wing groups:
  - Flag of the German Empire
  - Black-yellow-white flag of the Russian Empire
