= Coat of arms of Stellaland =

Stellaland coat of arms in the colours indicated on the postage stamps

The coat of arms of Stellaland was the official heraldic symbol of the short-lived Stellaland state in South Africa from 1883 to 1885. It was later revived as the municipal arms of Stellaland's capital, Vryburg.

== History ==
The coat of arms appears to have been designed and adopted shortly after Stellaland was proclaimed a republic in August 1883. It was depicted on the postage stamps from February 1884. It was also displayed on a green banner, known as the 'standard', which was flown outside the government offices in Vryburg. The Executive Council gave the standard to Queen Victoria of the United Kingdom in 1885 It was returned by her descendant King George V in 1934, and hung in the Vryburg town hall.

The Vryburg municipality adopted the arms in 1931, and were added to the mayor's chain of office in 1956. The arms were formally granted to the municipality by the administrator of the Cape Province in 1966, and registered at the Bureau of Heraldry in 1970. The arms are now used by the Naledi Municipality, North West, into which Vryburg has been incorporated.

== Blazon ==
The blazon of the arms is :

- Quarterly, I, Argent, a korhaan volant, a dexter hand issuant from a sleeve grasping the sinister foot, all proper; II, Vert, a mullet Argent; III, Azure, a pair of scales Or; IV, Gules, two fishes naiant and counter-naiant in pale Argent pierced by a sword point downward proper.
- Crest : A mullet Or. [Note : the English version of the registered blazon incorrectly gives the star as Argent]
- Motto : Gewapend en regtvaardig ('Armed and justified').

The korhaan represents the chief Massouw, the star the comet after which Stellaland was named, the scales justice, and the impaled fish the defeated chief Mankaroane.

Some postage stamps show the arms supported by two lions. There is also a painting showing the arms flanked by flags.

The Stellaland postage stamps are monochrome, with the tinctures of the arms indicated by cross-hatching. According to the cross-hatching, quarter 1 should be gold, quarter 2 blue, and quarters 3 and 4 red, as shown in the illustration (right). As these are not the colours of the arms as depicted on the government flag, the postage stamps are evidently incorrect in this respect.

== See also ==
- Coat of arms of the Cape Colony
- Coat of arms of Natal
- Coat of arms of the Orange Free State
- Coat of arms of the Orange River Colony
- Coat of arms of South Africa
- Coat of arms of the Transvaal
- Coat of arms of Western Cape Province
- Flag of Stellaland
