= Coat of arms of the Western Cape =

Coat of arms of Western Cape
- Armiger: Western Cape
- Adopted: 1998; 27 years ago
- Motto: Spes Bona ('Good Hope')

The coat of arms of the Western Cape is the official heraldic symbol of the Western Cape province of the Republic of South Africa. It has been in use since 1998.

== History ==
The Western Cape is one of the three provinces into which the former Cape Province was divided in 1994. It consists of the western and southern districts of the former province.

== Blazon ==
The arms were designed by the State Herald, Frederick Brownell, adopted by the provincial legislature, and registered at the Bureau of Heraldry in 1998. The official blazon is:

- Argent, on a pile embowed inverted throughout Azure, a Khoi clay pot with a conical base and two horizontally pierced lugs, Or, between in chief dexter an anchor Gules and sinister a bunch of grapes slipped and leaved proper.
- The shield ensigned of a coronet comprising a circlet Or, embellished of beadwork indented Gules and Azure heightened of six protea flowers Or, seeded Argent alternating with as many annulets, Or.
- Supporters: Dexter a quagga (Equus quagga quagga) and sinister a bontebok (Damasileus dorcas dorcas) proper.
- Special compartment: A stylised representation of Table Mountain Azure, bearing a riband with the fold-backs in the form of two ostrich feathers, Or.
- Motto: SPES BONA (Good Hope).

Blue and white are the colours of the Western Cape; the anchor alludes to the old name of 'Cape of Good Hope', the grapes refer to agriculture, and the clay pot to the Khoi, who have lived in the region for thousands of years.

== See also ==
- Coat of arms of the Cape Colony
- Coat of arms of Natal
- Coat of arms of the Orange Free State
- Coat of arms of the Orange River Colony
- Coat of arms of South Africa
- Coat of arms of the Transvaal
