= Themba Mabaso =

Thembinkosi 'Themba' Mabaso is a South African herald. He has served as State Herald of South Africa as the director of the country's Bureau of Heraldry since 2002.

Together with the Heraldry Council, his office forms part of the National Archives of South Africa, under the Ministry of Arts & Culture.

== Career ==
Before becoming a herald, Mabaso's professional experience was in art galleries and fine art preservation. In 1999 and 2000, he was associated with Johannesburg Art Gallery in Johannesburg and was a chairman of the Conseil International des Musées (International Council of Museums).

In 2002 Mabaso succeeded Frederick Brownell as State Herald of South Africa. His responsibilities including registering coats of arms, insignia badges, flags and seals. He also advises the South African government, corporations and individuals on matters of heraldry, uniforms and vexillology.

For example, when consulted on how the flag of South Africa should be displayed, Mabaso explained:

The Flag is like a written document. When you read a document you start from top to bottom, from left to right. According to our Flag, Red is at the top and blue at the bottom. So when the flag is displayed vertically, red should be the first one to be read, hence it is displayed on the left hand side.

Mabaso participates in important state occasions such as the inauguration of a new president of South Africa and represents South Africa at heraldic events worldwide, such as the XXVIIth International Congress of Genealogical and Heraldic Sciences in St Andrews, Scotland, in 2006. On this occasion, both Mabaso and his deputy Marcel van Rossum, wore tabards displaying a design based on the new coat of arms of South Africa adopted in 2000 and based on Khoisan art.

Heraldic offices
Preceded by Fred Brownell	State Herald of South Africa; 2002 – present	Incumbent
