= Coat of arms of Namibia =

Versions
- National Seal
- Armiger: Republic of Namibia
- Adopted: 1990
- Crest: An African fish eagle rising wings elevated and displayed proper
- Torse: A traditional head-ring Vert charged with six lozenges conjoined Or
- Shield: Tierced per bend sinister Azure, and Vert, a bend sinister Gules fimbriated Argent and in dexter chief a Sun with twelve straight rays Or charged with an annulet Azure
- Supporters: Two Oryx proper
- Compartment: A Namib sand dune with a Welwitschia mirabilis on the foreground
- Motto: Unity, Liberty, Justice

The banner of arms, which serves as national flag

The coat of arms of Namibia is the official heraldic symbol of Namibia. Introduced at the time of independence in 1990, it superseded the earlier coat of arms used by the South African administration of the territory.

== History ==
The Constituent Assembly which drew up the Namibian Constitution in 1989 appointed a National Symbols Sub-Committee to produce a flag and coat of arms for the country. The committee enlisted the assistance of the South African Bureau of Heraldry. After approving the flag, the committee decided to use the same design as the coat of arms, with the addition of an African fish eagle (Haliaeetus vocifer) for a crest, and two gemsbok (Oryx) as supporters. The Welwitschia mirabilis on the compartment was taken over from the former arms of South-West Africa (see below).

== Blazon ==
The arms are blazoned as follows:

- Shield: Tierced per bend sinister Azure, and Vert, a bend sinister Gules fimbriated Argent and in dexter chief a Sun with twelve straight rays Or charged with an annulet Azure (the design of the Flag of Namibia).
- Crest: Upon a traditional head-ring Vert charged with six lozenges conjoined Or, a fish eagle rising wings elevated and displayed proper.
- Supporters: Two oryx proper.
- Compartment: A Namib sand dune with a Welwitschia mirabilis on the foreground.
- Motto: Unity Liberty Justice.

== Earlier coats of arms ==
=== Proposed arms 1914 ===
In 1914, the German Empire government decided to assign coats of arms to German colonies, including South-West Africa. Arms were designed, but World War I broke out before the project was finalised, and the arms were never taken into use. The arms proposed for German South-West Africa depicted an Afrikaner bull's head, a diamond, and the German imperial eagle. In the 1920s, neo-colonialism, the proposed arms made a short public appearance, in a slightly modified form on postcards issued by the German Colonial Soldiers' League (German Deutscher Kolonialkrieger-Bund) and also as decoration on calendars.

1914 proposed coat of arms of German South-West Africa

=== Arms 1963–80 ===
In 1958, the South West African administration decided that the territory should have an official coat of arms. After obtaining the approval of the South African government, the administration engaged Dr Coenraad Beyers to design the arms. The design was finalised in 1961, taken into use in 1963, and registered at the Bureau of Heraldry in 1964.

The arms were discontinued when South-West Africa was reconstituted into a three-tier system of government in 1980. The second-tier Representative Authority of the Whites (1980–89) took over the arms in 1981.

The official blazon of the arms is :

- Per chevron ployé Argent and Gules, dexter a karakul ram's face caboshed Sable and sinister the head and neck of an Afrikander bull proper, in base two miner's hammers in saltire Or and there-under three triangular diamonds Argent 2 and 1; on a chief Gules a pale Argent charged with an eagle Sable langued and membered Gules, dexter a representation of Fort Namutoni and sinister a Portuguese padrao both Argent.
- Crest : A gemsbok statant gardant proper.
- Supporters: Dexter a springbok and sinister a kudu, both proper, resting on a desert-like knoll, with a growing Welwitschia mirabilis in the foreground proper.
- Motto : Viribus unitis (With United Forces).

Coat of arms of South West Africa (1963–80)
