= Hein du Toit =

Lieutenant General Heinrich du Toit SSA SM
- Born: 1926 (age 99–100)
- Military career
- Allegiance: South Africa
- Branch: South African Army
- Rank: Lieutenant General
- Commands: Chief of Staff Intelligence
- Awards

Lieutenant General Hein du Toit SSA SM (born 1926) was a South African Army officer who served as Chief of Staff Intelligence.

== Army career ==
Du Toit joined the UDF in 1953. By 1964 he was a staff officer in Directorate of Military Intelligence (DMI). He was appointed its deputy director in 1966. On 19 July 1971 he became the Director of the DMI, a position he held until 30 April 1974. The Directors position was renamed as the Chief of Staff Intelligence on the 1 May 1974 and he held it until 31 December 1977. He was also known as a historian, a former state archivist, heraldist and earned a LLB degree. After retirement from the SADF he served on the Heraldry Council of South Africa until 1995. He was also a professor of Strategic Studies at Rand Afrikaans University (RAU) after he retired from the military.

== Awards and decorations ==
- Star of South Africa (Gold) (SSAG)
- Southern Cross Medal (1952) (SM)
- Good Service Medal (Silver (20 Years))
- Permanent Force Good Service Medal
- Order of the Cloud and Banner (3^{rd} Grade - with Yellow Grand Cordon) (ORB) (Taiwan)

Heraldic offices
| Preceded by Judge Victor Hiemstra | Chairman Heraldry Council; 1984–1995 | Succeeded by Brig (Prof) Deon Fourie |
Military offices
| Preceded by Fritz Loots | Chief of Staff Intelligence; 1971–1977 | Succeeded by Ivan Lemmer (acting) |
