= Defence Intelligence Division (SANDF) =

South African military intelligence agency

- Active: 1962 - present
- Country: South Africa
- Branch: South African National Defence Force
- Type: Military Intelligence
- Role: Cyberwarfare; Intelligence, surveillance, target acquisition, and reconnaissance
- Motto: Vigilans et Sciens (until 1994)
- Colors: Black, White, Yellow
- Mascot: Owl (until 1994)

Commanders
- Chief of Defence Intelligence: Lt. Gen Thalita Mxakato

The Defence Intelligence Division of the South African National Defence Force (SANDF-ID also known as Defence Intelligence) is the primary military intelligence agency of South Africa which came into being on 27 April 1994. The other intelligence agencies of the country are:

- The National Intelligence Co-Ordinating Committee (NICOC)
- The National Intelligence Agency (NIA)
- The South African Secret Service (SASS)
- The Crime Intelligence Division of the South African Police Service (SAPS)

== History ==
=== Early years (1910-1961) ===
The Union of South Africa originally did not possess an independent intelligence service within the Union Defence Force (it was a dominion of the British Empire, and therefore received its intelligence from MI6.) In 1937, the Directorate Operations and Intelligence was formed within the UDF. 20 years later, in February 1957, on the instruction of Defence Minister Frans Erasmus it became fully responsible for the collection and interpretation of military intelligence.

=== Expansion of intelligence capabilities (1961-1994) ===
The intelligence section on 1 July 1962 was elevated to directorate status and was known as the Directorate Military Intelligence (DMI). After the establishment of the State Security Committee in 1963, DMI together with the Department of Foreign Affairs and the South African Police Service, served on this committee. On 1 January 1968, the formation of the South African Military Intelligence Corps took place, being authorized on 2 February 1968. In 1970 it became Military Intelligence Division (MID) and a year later, cam under the leadership of the Director-General Military Intelligence. On 15 April 1974, DGMI became the Chief Staff Intelligence (CSI) directly responsible to Commander of the South African Defence Force. The Intelligence Centre for the purpose of training was also set up at the former Radcliffe Observatory. On 2 November 1983 the Centre was accorded unit status and was designated the South African Military Intelligence College.

== Chiefs of Defence Intelligence ==
=== Chief Intelligence Officer ===
- Col. M. "Thuys" J. Uys (2 February 1961-22 December 1961)

=== Director Military Intelligence ===
- Brig Pierre Mauritz Retief (23 December 1961-2 January 1966)
- Maj. General F. W. Loots (3 January 1966-18 July 1971)

=== Chief of Staff Intelligence ===
- Lt. General H. de V. du Toit (19 July 1971-26 September 1977)
- Maj. General I. Lemmer (27 September 1977-14 June 1978)
- Lt. General P. W. van der Westhuizen (15 June 1978-30 June 1985)
- Vice admiral A. P. Putter (1 July 1985-31 March 1989)
- Lt General R. Badenhost (1 April 1989-30 November 1991)
- Lt. General C.P. van der Westhuizen (1 December 1991-31 March 1994)

=== Chiefs of Defence Intelligence ===
- Lt Gen D.R. Verbeek (1 April 1994-1999)
- Lt Gen M.M. Motau (1999-2009)
- Lt. General Abel Shilubane (2011-2012)
- Lt. General Jeremia Mduduzi Nyembe (2013-)
- Lt. General Thalita Mxakato (1 June 2021-present)
