= Norden Hartman =

South African archivist and herald

Norden Hartman (1921–1989) was a South African archivist and herald.

He joined the State Archives in 1948, and rose to the grade of senior archivist. He transferred to the Bureau of Heraldry when it was established in 1963, and was promoted to State Herald when Dr Coenraad Beyers retired in 1964. He served as State Herald until his own retirement in 1982.

As State Herald, Hartman established the Bureau as a respected heraldic office, encouraged the development of a distinctive artistic style (strongly influenced by Finnish practice), and innovations such as new lines of partition. The centenary of the archives service in 1976 gave the Bureau an opportunity to showcase its work.

== See also ==
- Bureau of Heraldry

== Sources ==
- Obituary in Arma No 126 (1989)

Heraldic offices
| Preceded by Coenraad Beyers | State Herald of South Africa; 1964–1982 | Succeeded by Frederick Brownell |
