= Mojo Motau =

Lieutenant General Mojo Motau OLS, SD, DMG, MMM
- Born: Maomela Johannes Motau
- Military career
- Allegiance: South Africa
- Branch: South African Army
- Service years: 1994–2009
- Rank: Lieutenant General
- Nickname: Mojo
- Commands: Chief of Defence Intelligence; Deputy Chief of Defence Intelligence
- Awards: Order of Luthuli OLS Southern Cross Decoration SD Decoration for Merit DMG Military Merit Medal MMM Operational Medal for Southern Africa South Africa Service Medal Unitas (Unity) Medal Medalje vir Troue Diens (Medal for Loyal Service) Service Medal National Order of Merit
- Other work: Chairman, ARMSCOR

Lieutenant General Mojo Motau OLS SD DMG MMM is a retired South African Army general who served as Chief of Defence Intelligence from 1998–2009.

General Maomela Moreti Motau joined the ranks of Umkhonto we Sizwe (MK) in 1974. He participated in the Struggle in various capacities and rose to serve in the military's high command. He was the last Chief of Military Intelligence of MK.

He held this position until integration of forces after the negotiations. He participated in the military negotiations as part of the national negotiations that ushered in democratic change in South Africa.

Motau headed the Military Strategy Group of MK and was responsible for military negotiations at the Trade Centre in Kempton Park, which drafted the defence chapter of the Transitional Constitution of 1993. He set on the Joint Military Command Council, which drafted the detailed programmes of integration of forces as provided for in the Transitional Constitution.

He was integrated into the South African National Defence Force as Brigadier. Brig Motau completed the Senior Command and Staff Course in 1996. He later served as Deputy Chief of Defence Intelligence with the rank of Major General.

In 1998 he was appointed Chief of Defence Intelligence with the rank of Lt General, and member of the Defence Staff Council and Military Command Council.

Motau participated in the creation of the National Intelligence Coordinating Committee and the National Security Council. He retired in 2009 and actively participated in business while still being called upon from time to time to carry out national duties.

Amongst many of his contributions, Motau was involved in the Democratic Republic of Congo, where he facilitated the difficult negotiations of armed groups in the conflict leading to the adoption of the agreement that saw the establishment of the DRC Armed Forces that integrated all armed groups in the conflict.

He also negotiated in the Zambia National Peace and Reconciliation for an agreement between Zambian President Frederick Chiluba and former President Kenneth Kaunda. This agreement led to the release of former President Kaunda from house arrest.

Former President Kaunda was according to the agreement declared Father of the Nation, and government accorded him the necessary respect and support. This improved the relations between South Africa and Zambia. President Mandela and Deputy President Mbeki at the time were highly impressed by what General Motau achieved.

Motau also worked on the draft resolution to the conflict of Burundi after the negotiations in Tanzania stalled. The then Foreign Minister of Tanzania, who later became President of the Republic of Tanzania, His Excellency Jakaya Kikwete, as facilitator of the negotiations, adopted Motau's draft proposal, which was finally adopted by the parties involved in the conflict as the final agreement.

== Military career ==
He is a retired South African Army general who was chief of MK Intelligence in exile. He integrated as a brigadier in 1994 and was later appointed as Deputy Chief of Defence Intelligence. He served as Chief of Defence Intelligence for the SANDF from 1998 – 2009.

== Awards and decorations ==
- Order of Luthuli (Silver) (OLS)
- Southern Cross Decoration (SD)
- Decoration for Merit (Gold) (DMG)
- Military Merit Medal (MMM)
- Operational Medal for Southern Africa
- South Africa Service Medal
- Unitas (Unity) Medal
- Medalje vir Troue Diens (Medal for Loyal Service) (30 Year Clasp)
- Service Medal (Silver)
- Service Medal (Bronze)
- Commander National Order of Merit (France)

Business positions
Preceded by Popo Molefe	ARMSCOR; 2011–2013	Succeeded by Refiloe Mudimu
Military offices
Preceded by Dirk Verbeek	Chief of Defence Intelligence; 1998–2009	Succeeded by Abel Shilubane
