= Abel Shilubane =

South African Army general (2010–2012)

Lieutenant General Abel Shilubane PS MMB
- Born: Abel Shilubane; 1952 (age 73–74)
- Spouse: Felicity Shilubane (m. 2002)
- Children: 5
- Military career
- Allegiance: South Africa
- Branch: South African Army
- Service years: 1994–2012
- Rank: Lieutenant General
- Commands: Chief of Defence Intelligence; Deputy Chief of Defence Intelligence
- Awards: iPhrothiya yeSiliva PS Merit Medal MMB Operational Medal for Southern Africa South Africa Service Medal Tshumelo Ikatelaho (General Service Medal) Unitas (Unity) Medal Medalje vir Troue Diens (Medal for Loyal Service) Good Service Medal Service Medal

Lieutenant General Abel Shilubane PS MMB (born 1952), is a retired South African Army general who served as Chief of Defence Intelligence of the South African National Defence Force (SANDF) from 2010 to 2012.

== Military career ==
He served in the uMkhonto we Sizwe in exile and after the 1994 elections, he served in the SANDF. He was appointed as South Africa's Chief of Defence Intelligence after a short stint in an acting capacity from April 2009. Gen Shilubane was confirmed on the post of CDI in November 2010.

Gen Shilubane retired with pension from the SANDF in 2012 and was posted as an Ambassador to Senegal. He was considered for the role of Ambassador to Angola.

== Awards and decorations ==
- iPhrothiya yeSiliva (Silver Protea) (PS)
- Merit Medal (Bronze) (MMB)
- Operational Medal for Southern Africa
- South Africa Service Medal
- Tshumelo Ikatelaho (General Service Medal)
- Unitas (Unity) Medal
- Medalje vir Troue Diens (Medal for Loyal Service) (30 Year Clasp)
- Good Service Medal (Silver (20 Years))
- Service Medal (Bronze)

Diplomatic posts
Unknown	Ambassador to Senegal; 2013–2016	Unknown
Unknown	Ambassador to DR Congo; 2016–current	Incumbent
Military offices
Preceded by Mojo Motau	Chief of Defence Intelligence; 2010–2012	Succeeded by Jeremia Nyembe
