= Ex unitate vires =

National motto of South Africa (1910–2000)

The motto on the former coat of arms of South Africa

Ex unitate vires (lit. "from unity, strength") is a Latin phrase formerly used as the national motto of South Africa. It was originally translated as "Union is Strength" but was later revised in 1961 to mean "Unity is Strength". Its Dutch version is "Eendracht maakt macht", itself a non-literal translation of "in concordia res parvae crescunt", originally the motto of the Dutch Republic. That translation, along with its French counterpart - "L'union fait la force" - is also the current motto of Belgium. It was adopted as the national motto of South Africa in 1910 but was replaced in 2000.

== History ==
=== Adoption ===
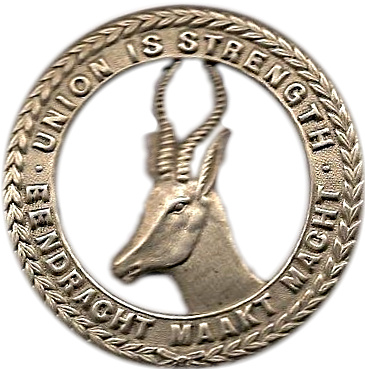
The motto in English and Dutch on the South African Infantry's cap badge

When the British Empire's colonies of Cape Colony, Transvaal Colony, Natal Colony, and the Orange River Colony joined together to form the Union of South Africa, a coat of arms was granted to them by King George V. On the arms was the motto "Ex Unitate Vires" as a symbol that the English-speaking-majority and Afrikaner-majority British colonies were stronger within the Union. It was also chosen in Latin as a neutral language to avoid using either English or Afrikaans due to sensitivities after the Second Boer War. During the First World War, the 1st South African Infantry used the English and Dutch translation of the motto on their cap badge alongside the springbok. In 1947, King George VI toured South Africa. However, due to noticing the South African Police (whom the King referred to as "Gestapo") enforcing segregation in keeping blacks away from him and a request from the South African government to only shake hands with whites, the King noticed the motto on the tablecloth of his royal train and stated: "Huh, not much bloody Unitate about this place!"

=== Abolition ===
Following the Union of South Africa's transition to the Republic of South Africa in 1961, the new constitution did not refer to the national motto, therefore, its legal status was unchanged as the coat of arms was unchanged, though the official translation of Ex Unitate Vires was changed to "Unity is Strength". Following the end of apartheid in 1994, the motto was retained along with the coat of arms for a time. However, because of the implication that it represented white British and Afrikaners uniting against black people, "Ex Unitate Vires" was replaced in 2000 as the national motto of South Africa by "ǃke e꞉ ǀxarra ǁke" (ǀXam: Unity Through Diversity").

== See also ==
- Dzala ertobashia
