= Coat of arms of the Transvaal =

South African Republic (Transvaal) coat of arms
- Adopted: 1869
- Crest: Eagle
- Motto: Eendragt maakt magt ('Unity makes strength')

The coat of arms of the Transvaal was the official heraldic symbol of the South African Republic from 1866 to 1877 and again from 1881 to 1902, and later the symbol of the Transvaal Province from 1954 to 1994 in a simplified form. It is now obsolete.

== History ==
The South African Republic was established in 1857. On 18 February 1858, the Volksraad (legislature) resolved that the new state should have the following coat of arms:

On a silver field there shall be placed a wagon and a golden anchor, while an eagle shall rest upon the arms. On the right hand side of the arms a man in national costume with a gun and accessories. On the left hand side a lion.

— National and Provincial Symbols, F.G. Brownell

The earliest known appearance of the arms was on banknotes issued in 1866. The crudely drawn arms were depicted as a shield with a lion, an anchor, and a man in the upper half, an ox-wagon in the lower half, and the motto 'Eendragt maakt magt' (sic, cf. Flag of the SAR) on a riband across the top. This rendition also appeared on the Staatscourant (government gazette) from 1867.

A better version, in which the shield was divided into sections, an eagle was perched on top, and three flags were draped down each side, first appeared on the postage stamps in 1869, and this became the preferred rendition. From 1871, this too appeared on the banknotes, and from 1872 it was on the masthead of the Staatscourant.

The arms were in abeyance during the British occupation of the Transvaal, from 1877 to 1881. Revived in 1881, they became obsolete again when the republic ceased to exist in 1902.

In 1950, the Transvaal provincial administration decided to adopt the old arms as provincial arms and commissioned chief archivist Dr Coenraad Beyers to investigate and report on the most suitable version. The arms were apparently introduced in 1954, and they were used until the province ceased to exist in 1994.

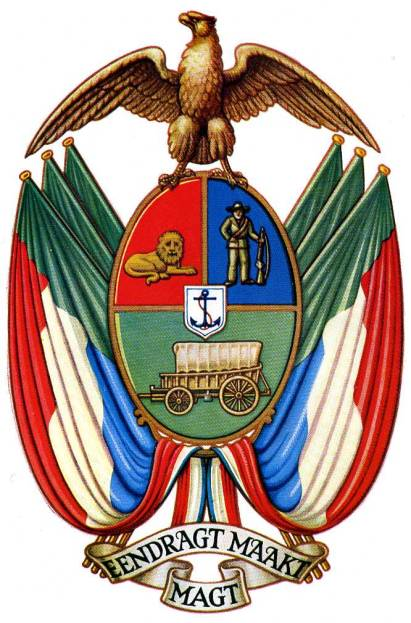
Version used by the Transvaal Province

== Blazon ==
The arms were recorded at the College of Arms in July 1955, and registered at the Bureau of Heraldry in October 1967. The official blazon is:

- An oval shield per fess, the chief divided per pale; dexter Gules, a natural lion contourne couchant gardant Or; sinister Azure, a bearded man in national dress wearing a hat and bandolier, and holding in the left hand a gun resting upon the ground; in base Vert, a Voortrekker wagon proper; on an inescutcheon Argent an anchor Sable, cabled Gules.
- Perched on the shield an eagle displayed Or.
- Behind the shield and draped below on both sides three flags of the South African Republic, green, red, white and blue.
- Motto: EENDRACHT MAAKT MAGT

== See also ==
- Coat of arms of the Cape Colony
- Coat of arms of Natal
- Coat of arms of the Orange Free State
- Coat of arms of the Orange River Colony
- Coat of arms of South Africa
- South African heraldry
