= Jeremia Nyembe =

Lieutenant General Jeremia Nyembe MMM
- Born: Jeremia M. Nyembe
- Military career
- Allegiance: South Africa
- Branch: South African Air Force
- Service years: 1994–2021
- Rank: Lieutenant General
- Commands: Chief of Defence Intelligence
- Awards: Military Merit Medal MMM Operational Medal for Southern Africa South Africa Service Medal Unitas (Unity) Medal Medalje vir Troue Diens (Medal for Loyal Service) Good Service Medal Service Medal

Lieutenant General Jeremia Nyembe MMM is a retired South African Air Force general who served as Chief of Defence Intelligence from 2013 to 2021

== Military career ==
He served in the uMkhonto we Sizwe in exile. He joined the SAAF during integration during 1994. He was appointed as Chief of Defence Intelligence from 2013 to 2021.

He retired with pension on 31 May 2021.

== Awards and decorations ==
- Military Merit Medal (MMM)
- Operational Medal for Southern Africa
- South Africa Service Medal
- Unitas (Unity) Medal
- Medalje vir Troue Diens (Medal for Loyal Service) (30 Year Clasp)
- Good Service Medal (Silver (20 Years))
- Service Medal (Bronze)

Military offices
Preceded by Abel Shilubane	Chief of Defence Intelligence; 2013–2021	Succeeded by Thalita Mxakatho
