= List of bailiffs and dames grand cross of the Order of St John =

This is a list of bailiffs and dames grand cross of the Most Venerable Order of the Hospital of Saint John of Jerusalem.

Appointment	Grade	Name	Birth	Death	Notes
12 June 1926	Bailiff Grand Cross	The King	3 June 1865	20 January 1936	Sovereign Head of the Order 1910–1936
12 June 1926	Bailiff Grand Cross	Colonel The Prince of Wales KG KT PC GCSI GCMG &c	23 June 1894	28 May 1972	Sovereign Head of the Order January–December 1936
12 June 1926	Bailiff Grand Cross	Colonel The Duke of York KG KT GCVO &c	14 December 1895	6 February 1952	Sovereign Head of the Order 1936–1952
12 June 1926	Bailiff Grand Cross	Field Marshal The Duke of Connaught KG KT KP PC GCB &c	1 May 1850	16 January 1942	Grand Prior of the Order 1910–1939
12 June 1926	Bailiff Grand Cross	Major-General Prince Arthur of Connaught KG KT PC GCMG GCVO &c	13 January 1883	12 September 1938	
12 June 1926	Associate Bailiff Grand Cross	The King of Norway KG GCB GCVO &c	3 August 1872	21 September 1957	
12 June 1926	Associate Bailiff Grand Cross	The King of the Belgians	8 April 1875	17 February 1934	
12 June 1926	Bailiff Grand Cross	Major-General The Earl of Scarbrough GBE KCB TD	16 November 1857	4 March 1945	Sub-Prior of the Order 1923–1943
12 June 1926	Bailiff Grand Cross	The Archbishop of York	31 October 1864	5 December 1945	Prelate of the Order
12 June 1926	Bailiff Grand Cross	Lieutenant-General Sir Aylmer Hunter-Weston KCB DSO RE MP	23 September 1854	18 March 1940	Chancellor of the Order 1924–1938
12 June 1926	Bailiff Grand Cross	Sir John Prescott Hewett GCSI KBE CIE	25 August 1854	27 September 1941	Bailiff of Egle 1925–
12 June 1926	Bailiff Grand Cross	Major-General James Cecil Dalton RA	31 August 1848	12 May 1931	
12 June 1926	Bailiff Grand Cross	Colonel The Lord William Cecil CVO	2 November 1854	16 April 1943	
12 June 1926	Bailiff Grand Cross	Colonel Sir Charles Wyndham Murray KCB	22 February 1844	1 November 1928	
12 June 1926	Bailiff Grand Cross	The Earl of Ranfurly PC(I) GCMG	14 August 1856	1 October 1933	
12 June 1926	Bailiff Grand Cross	Edmund Fraser		23 July 1937	
12 June 1926	Bailiff Grand Cross	Lieutenant-Colonel Arthur Campbell Yate	28 February 1853	12 June 1929	
12 June 1926	Bailiff Grand Cross	Lieutenant-Colonel Sir Richard Carnac Temple Bt CB CIE	15 October 1850	3 March 1931	
12 June 1926	Bailiff Grand Cross	Colonel Sir Herbert Jekyll KCMG	22 November 1846	30 September 1932	
12 June 1926	Dame Grand Cross	The QUEEN	26 May 1867	24 March 1953	
12 June 1926	Dame Grand Cross	The Princess Mary, Viscountess Lascelles	25 April 1897	28 March 1965	
12 June 1926	Dame Grand Cross	The Duchess of York	4 August 1900	30 March 2002	
12 June 1926	Dame Grand Cross	The Princess Louise, Duchess of Argyll GBE VA CI RRC	18 March 1848	3 December 1939	
12 June 1926	Dame Grand Cross	The Princess Beatrice GBE VA CI RRC	14 April 1857	26 October 1944	
12 June 1926	Dame Grand Cross	Princess Alice, Countess of Athlone VA	25 February 1883	3 January 1981	
12 June 1926	Dame Grand Cross	Princess Arthur of Connaught, Duchess of Fife RRC	17 May 1891	26 February 1959	
12 June 1926	Dame Grand Cross	Lady Furley RRC		11 February 1940	
12 June 1926	Dame Grand Cross	The Marchioness of Lansdowne GBE CH VA CI	17 December 1850	21 October 1932	
20 June 1928	Dame Grand Cross	The Princess Royal VA CI	20 February 1867	4 January 1931	
20 June 1928	Dame Grand Cross	The Princess Victoria VA CI	6 July 1868	3 December 1935	
20 June 1928	Dame Grand Cross	The Queen of Norway VA CI	26 November 1869	20 November 1938	
20 June 1928	Dame Grand Cross	Princess Helena Victoria GBE VA CI RRC	3 May 1870	13 March 1948	
20 June 1928	Dame Grand Cross	Princess Marie Louise GBE VA CI RRC	12 August 1872	8 December 1956	
20 June 1928	Dame Grand Cross	Lady Perrott RRC		4 July 1939	
20 June 1928	Dame Grand Cross	Lady Cecil CBE	30 July 1865	14 September 1941	
20 June 1928	Dame Grand Cross	Susan, Duchess of Somerset	11 January 1853	30 January 1936	
19 December 1928	Bailiff Grand Cross	Colonel Sir James Richardson Andrew Clark Bt CB CMG FRCSEd	24 August 1852	18 January 1948	
23 December 1929	Bailiff Grand Cross	Major-General The Earl of Athlone KG GCB GCVO DSO ADC	14 April 1874	16 January 1957	
23 December 1930	Bailiff Grand Cross	The Duke of Gloucester KG GCVO PC	31 March 1900	10 June 1974	Grand Prior of the Order 1939–1974
23 December 1930	Bailiff Grand Cross	The Prince George KG GCVO	20 December 1902	25 August 1942	
23 December 1931	Associate Bailiff Grand Cross	Ex-King George II of Greece	19 July 1890	1 April 1947	
22 June 1934	Bailiff Grand Cross	Colonel The Earl of Onslow OBE PC	23 August 1876	9 June 1945	
22 June 1934	Bailiff Grand Cross	Brigader-General The Earl of Shaftesbury KP GCVO CBE PC	31 August 1869	25 March 1961	
22 June 1934	Dame Grand Cross	Lady Victoria Patricia Helena Elizabeth Ramsay CI	17 March 1886	12 January 1974	
22 June 1934	Dame Grand Cross	Robinia Marion, Viscountess Mountgarret OBE		13 December 1944	
21 June 1935	Associate Bailiff Grand Cross	The King of Sweden	16 June 1858	29 October 1950	
21 June 1935	Dame Grand Cross	The Duchess of Kent	13 December 1906	27 August 1968	
18 December 1935	Associate Bailiff Grand Cross	The King of Denmark	26 September 1870	20 April 1947	
22 December 1936	Dame Grand Cross	The Duchess of Gloucester	25 December 1901	29 October 2004	
22 December 1938	Bailiff Grand Cross	The Earl of Plymouth PC	4 February 1889	1 October 1943	Prior of the Order 1943
22 December 1938	Dame Grand Cross	The Countess of Onslow CBE ARRC	7 November 1883	23 October 1954	
18 June 1940	Bailiff Grand Cross	The Earl of Clarendon KG GCVO GCMG PC	7 June 1877	13 December 1955	Prior of the Order 1943–1946
18 June 1940	Dame Grand Cross	The Marchioness of Bute DBE	19 August 1880	16 May 1947	
19 June 1941	Associate Dame Grand Cross	The Queen of the Netherlands	31 August 1880	28 November 1962	
24 December 1941	Bailiff Grand Cross	Colonel Charles Joseph Trimble CB CMG VD TD LRCPEd	16 March 1856	8 October 1944	
21 June 1943	Associate Bailiff Grand Cross	The King of Yugoslavia	6 September 1923	3 November 1970	
21 June 1943	Dame Grand Cross	Edith Marione, Mrs Perowne	1874		
December 1945	Knight Grand Cross	The Earl of Lytton KG GCSI GCIE PC	9 August 1876	25 October 1947	
December 1945	Knight Grand Cross	Sir Edwin James King KCB CMG TD ADC	1877	11 July 1952	Chancellor of the Order 1945–1951
December 1945	Dame Grand Cross	The Lady Louis Mountbatten CBE	28 November 1901	21 February 1960	
2 July 1947	Dame Grand Cross	The Princess Elizabeth CI	21 April 1926	8 September 2022	Sovereign Head of the Order 1952–2022
2 July 1947	Bailiff Grand Cross	Colonel Sir Robert Heaton Rhodes	27 February 1861	30 July 1956	
23 June 1948	Associate Bailiff Grand Cross	The King of Denmark	11 March 1899	14 January 1972	
23 June 1948	Associate Bailiff Grand Cross	The King of the Hellenes	14 December 1901	6 March 1964	
23 June 1948	Bailiff Grand Cross	Colonel The Earl of Powis	24 June 1862	9 November 1952	
1 July 1955	Bailiff Grand Cross	Colonel The Lord Webb-Johnson GCVO CBE DSO TD MB FRCS	4 September 1880	28 May 1958	
1 July 1955	Bailiff Grand Cross	Lieutenant-Colonel Sir James Sands Elliott VD LLD MD FRACS	28 May 1880	26 October 1959	
1 July 1955	Bailiff Grand Cross	Vincent Massey PC CH LLD FRSC	20 February 1887	30 December 1967	
1 July 1955	Bailiff Grand Cross	Group Captain Sir Hugh Raymond Guy Poate MVO	16 January 1884	26 January 1961	
20 June 1956	Dame Grand Cross	The Princess Margaret CI GCVO	21 August 1930	9 February 2002	
18 December 1980	Dame Grand Cross	Olivera Rowena, Lady Traherne OBE	3 September 1910	22 October 1986	
11 January 1983	Bailiff Grand Cross	Sir Alan Thomas Gandell CBE	8 October 1904	10 July 1988	
11 January 1983	Dame Grand Cross	Yvette, Mlle Loiselle			
19 March 1984	Bailiff Grand Cross	Sir Neville Drake Pixley MBE VRD	21 September 1905	12 August 1993	
19 March 1984	Bailiff Grand Cross	Thomas Hippisley Coulter OBE			
19 March 1984	Associate Bailiff Grand Cross	Qaboos bin Said, Sultan of Oman	18 November 1940	10 January 2020	
19 March 1984	Dame Grand Cross	The Lady Moyra Browne DBE SEN	2 March 1918	4 December 2016	
9 July 1987	Baliff Grand Cross	Colonel The Lord Mais GBE	7 July 1911	28 November 1993	
9 July 1987	Baliff Grand Cross	Sir Stephen James Hamilton Miller KCVO MD FRCS	19 July 1915	12 April 1996	
9 July 1987	Baliff Grand Cross	Sir Randal Forbes Elliott KBE	12 October 1922	20 July 2010	
9 July 1987	Dame Grand Cross	The Countess Beauchamp MBE	1895	1989	
9 July 1987	Dame Grand Cross	The Lady Serena Mary Barbara James	30 March 1901	26 October 2000	
11 March 1988	Bailiff Grand Cross	The Lord Westbury MC DL	16 July 1922	12 October 2001	Bailiff of Egle 1988–1993
16 June 1989	Dame Grand Cross	Queen Noor of Jordan	23 August 1951		
22 August 1995	Bailiff Grand Cross	Brigadier-General George E. Beament OBE CM CD QC	12 April 1908	8 September 2005	
22 August 1995	Dame Grand Cross	June, Marchioness of Aberdeen and Temair CBE	29 December 1913	22 June 2009	
22 January 1998	Bailiff Grand Cross	Professor Villis Marshall			
22 January 1998	Bailiff Grand Cross	John Alexander Strachan		5 September 2025	
19 January 2004	Bailiff Grand Cross	Nelson Rolihlahla Mandela OM	18 July 1918	5 December 2013	
24 August 2004	Bailiff Grand Cross	Colonel James Stirling of Garden CBE TD	8 September 1930		
24 August 2004	Dame Grand Cross	Audrey Caroline, Baroness Emerton DBE DL	10 September 1935		
24 August 2004	Dame Grand Cross	June Daphne, Lady Blundell	19 June 1922	31 October 2012	
27 July 2005	Bailiff Grand Cross	Neville Byron Darrow	1 March 1938		
5 May 2009	Bailiff Grand Cross	Fra Robert Matthew Festing OBE TD DL	30 November 1949	12 November 2021	
5 May 2009	Bailiff Grand Cross	Brigadier John Hemsley OBE	27 January 1935		
5 May 2009	Dame Grand Cross	The Princess Royal KG KT GCVO	15 August 1950		
22 April 2013	Bailiff Grand Cross	Professor Jonathan Simon Christopher Riley-Smith	27 June 1938	13 September 2016	
22 April 2013	Dame Grand Cross	Judith Ann, Mrs Hoban			
26 June 2014	Bailiff Grand Cross	David Patrick Henry Burgess MBE			
30 July 2014	Bailiff Grand Cross	Major General (Retired) Professor John Hemsley Pearn AO RFD			
19 September 2014	Bailiff Grand Cross	Alfred Marshall Acuff Jr			
19 September 2014	Bailiff Grand Cross	Low Bin Tick OBE			
21 October 2016	Bailiff Grand Cross	Lieutenant Colonel Sir Walter Hugh Malcolm Ross GCVO, OBE	27 October 1943	27 October 2019	
21 October 2016	Bailiff Grand Cross	The Right Reverend Timothy John Stevens CBE	31 December 1946		Prelate of the Order 2016 - 2025
15 May 2017	Dame Grand Cross	Mary Angela Fiona, Lady Barttelot MBE DL	26 February 1944		Bailiff of Egle 2017–
21 September 2017	Bailiff Grand Cross	Archbishop Emeritus Desmond Tutu	7 October 1931	26 December 2021	
29 January 2020	Bailiff Grand Cross	Hon Major (rtd) Marsden Madoka	15 March 1943		
20 April 2020	Dame Grand Cross	Dr Gillian Elisabeth Willmore	30 December 1949		Chancellor of the Order 2022 - 2023
15 February 2021	Bailiff Grand Cross	Professor Deon François Schonland Fourie	17 November 1932		
15 February 2021	Bailiff Grand Cross	Dr Steven Alan Evans			Subprior of the Order 2022 - 2025
14 April 2022	Dame Grand Cross	The Duchess of Edinburgh GCVO CD	20 January 1965		
30 April 2022	Bailiff Grand Cross	Robert Hector White			
7 February 2023	Dame Grand Cross	Ann Elizabeth Cable MBE DL			
26 June 2023	Bailiff Grand Cross	Thomas Matthew Budd			Chancellor of the Order 2023 -
31 January 2024	Bailiff Grand Cross	Cameron John Oxley			
23 January 2025	Bailiff Grand Cross	Sir David Hempleman-Adams KCVO OBE DL	10 October 1956		
24 June 2025	Bailiff Grand Cross	Dr Michel C. Doré			Sub Prior of the Order 2025 -
24 June 2025	Bailiff Grand Cross	Archbishop Emeritus Sir David Moxon KNZM			Pelate of the Order 2025 -
