= Dirk Verbeek =

Lieutenant General Dirk Verbeek SD SM MMM
- Born: Dirk R Verbeek; Ficksburg, Orange Free State
- Military career
- Allegiance: South Africa
- Branch: South African Army
- Service years: 1967–1998
- Rank: Lieutenant General
- Unit: Armoured Corps
- Commands: Chief of Staff Intelligence; Chief Director Counter Intelligence
- Conflicts: Border War
- Awards: Southern Cross Decoration SD Southern Cross Medal SM Military Merit Medal MMM Pro Patria Medal Southern Africa Medal General Service Medal (South Africa) Unitas (Unity) Medal Good Service Medal

Lieutenant General Dirk Verbeek SD SM MMM is a South African Army general who spent his career in the Military Intelligence Service. He served as Chief of Staff Intelligence for the SANDF from 1994 - 1998.

== Military career ==
In 1988, as a major general, he was appointed as the Chief Director Counter Intelligence until 1993. Chief of Staff Intelligence from 1994 – 1998.

== Awards and decorations ==
- Southern Cross Decoration (SD)
- Southern Cross Medal (1975) (SM)
- Military Merit Medal (MMM)
- Pro Patria Medal
- Southern Africa Medal
- General Service Medal (South Africa)
- Unitas (Unity) Medal
- Good Service Medal (Gold (30 Years))
- Good Service Medal (Silver (20 Years))
- Good Service Medal (Bronze (10 Years))

Military offices
Preceded by Joffel van der Westhuizen	Chief of Staff Intelligence; 1994–1998	Succeeded by Mojo Motau
