= Coat of arms of the Orange Free State =

Orange Free State coat of arms
- Adopted: 23 February 1857
- Relinquished: 27 April 1994
- Motto: Geduld en Moed (Afrikaans) "Patience and Courage"

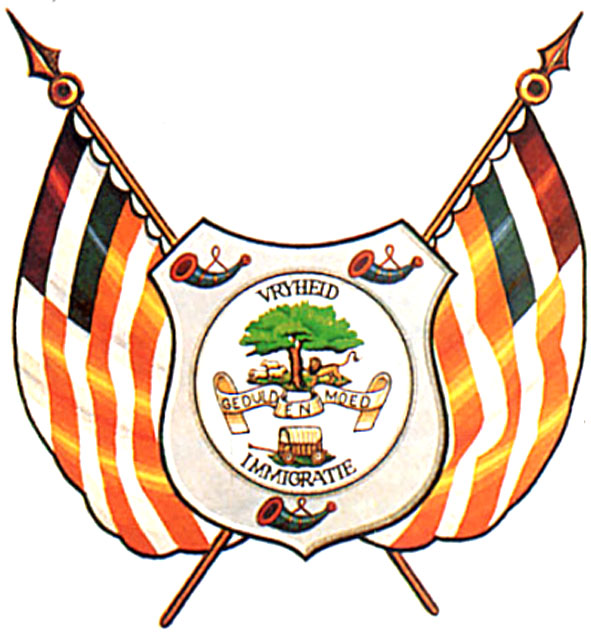
1993 artist's recreation of the coat of arms of the Orange Free State

The coat of arms of the Orange Free State was the official heraldic symbol of the Orange Free State as a republic from 1857 to 1902, and later, from 1937 to 1994, as a province of South Africa. It is now obsolete.

== History ==
The Orange Free State was established as a republic in 1854. It needed official symbols, and its first state president, Josias Hoffman decided to have them professionally designed in the Netherlands. At his request, King Willem III of the Netherlands had a flag and coat of arms designed by the Hoge Raad van Adel during 1855, and sent them out to South Africa. As the Orange Free State was named after the Orange River which, in turn, had been named after the Dutch royal family, the arms depicted a wavy orange fess (stripe) representing the river, and three bugle horns, which are the badge of the House of Orange.

A rendering of the original blazon proposed by the Supreme Court of Nobility of the Netherlands in 1855.

By the time the designs reached Bloemfontein, in January 1856, Hoffman had resigned and been succeeded by Jacobus Boshof. Apparently unaware that state symbols were being designed in the Netherlands, Boshof had had a Great Seal designed and manufactured, and approved by the Volksraad (legislature). The seal depicted a tree of liberty, sheep, a lion, and an ox-wagon. When Boshof placed the flag and coat of arms designs before the Volksraad on 28 February 1856, the legislators decided that

The design of the flag sent by the King of the Netherlands shall be adopted, and to the coat of arms sent by the above shall be added the already existing arms in the Great Seal of the State, with omission of the orange stripe.

The coat of arms, as actually adopted, then displayed the design of the Great Seal between the three bugle horns. This hybrid design was officially introduced on the republic's third anniversary, 23 February 1857, and was used until the republic ceased to exist on 31 May 1902.

As the Orange River Colony (1902–10), the territory had a different coat of arms, granted by King Edward VII of the United Kingdom.

When the colony became a province of the Union of South Africa in 1910, the provincial administration took over the Orange River Colony arms, which it used until 1925. In 1937, after a twelve-year period without official arms, the provincial administration adopted the old republican arms, and they were used as the provincial arms until the Orange Free State was reconstituted as the Free State Province in 1994.

== Blazon ==
The arms were recorded at the College of Arms in July 1955, and registered at the Bureau of Heraldry in October 1967. The official blazon is:

On a shield Argent, between three bugle horns Azure, garnished and stringed Gules, a representation of the seal of the Orange Free State Republic as adopted in 1856 viz., on a white roundel, in chief a tree on an island, between dexter, three sheep and sinister a natural lion supporting the tree with his dexter paw, in base a voortrekker wagon on an island, all proper; on a ribbon draped fesswise, the motto GEDULD EN MOED, above the tree the word VRYHEID and below the wagon the word IMMIGRATIE; behind the shield, on two staves in saltire with ball and spear points Or, two flags of the same Republic draped on both sides, each with seven stripes visible, alternately white and orange and a canton of three stripes, red, white and blue.

== See also ==
- Coat of arms of the Cape Colony
- Coat of arms of Natal
- Coat of arms of the Orange River Colony
- Coat of arms of South Africa
- Coat of arms of the Transvaal
- South African heraldry
- Flag of Orange Free State
