= Coat of arms of Natal =

Versions
- Badge of the Natal Colony 1875-1907
- Adopted: 1907

The coat of arms of Natal was the official heraldic symbol of Natal as a British colony from 1907 to 1910, and as a province of South Africa from 1910 to 1994. It is now obsolete.

== History ==
As a British colony, Natal's first official symbol was a Public Seal, authorised by Queen Victoria in 1846, and also used as a flag badge from 1870.

The seal was of a standard pattern which first came into use on the Great Seal of Newfoundland in 1839 and was described as follows: "Within a Chippendale-type frame, a on plain, two Wildebeest in full course at random (to sinister), with the words COLONY OF NATAL beneath the frame. The frame itself is ensigned with the Royal Arms and around the circumference appears the legend VICTORIA DEI GRATIA BRITANNIAR. REG. F.D." It depicted the British royal coat of arms in the upper half; in the lower half was an ornamental frame enclosing a scene of two wildebeest (gnu) galloping across a plain.

The wildebeest became the popular symbol of Natal, and when the government decided in 1905 to obtain an official coat of arms, the wildebeest was an obvious choice for the design. The arms, designed by G. Ambrose Lee, the York Herald at the College of Arms, were granted by King Edward VII by Royal Warrant on 16 May 1907.

After Natal became a province of the Union of South Africa in 1910, the provincial administration took over the arms. They were used as the standalone provincial arms until Natal was reconstituted as KwaZulu-Natal in 1994. However, they continued to be used officially jointly with the coat of arms of KwaZulu until 2004 due to the new province being unable to agree on a new coat of arms.

== Blazon ==
In their original form, as used by the colonial government, the Arms of 1907 consisted only of a shield, blazoned as follows:

Azure, in front of mountains and on a plain two black wildebeesten in full course at random all proper.

The provincial administration embellished the arms by placing an imperial crown (so-called 'Tudor crown') above the shield, and a riband inscribed 'Natal' below it. New artwork, introduced in 1930, altered details of the crown, by replacing the fleurs de lis with crosses and omitting the pearls from the transverse arch. This version appeared on the province's Official Gazette and other publications.

The arms were recorded in this form at the College of Arms in July 1955, and registered at the Bureau of Heraldry in January 1969.

== See also ==
- Coat of arms of the Cape Colony
- Coat of arms of the Orange Free State
- Coat of arms of the Orange River Colony
- Coat of arms of South Africa
- Coat of arms of the Transvaal
- South African heraldry
