= Deon Fourie (army general) =

South African academic and military officer (1932–2025)

Brigadier General Deon François Schönland Fourie GCStJ SD MMM JCD
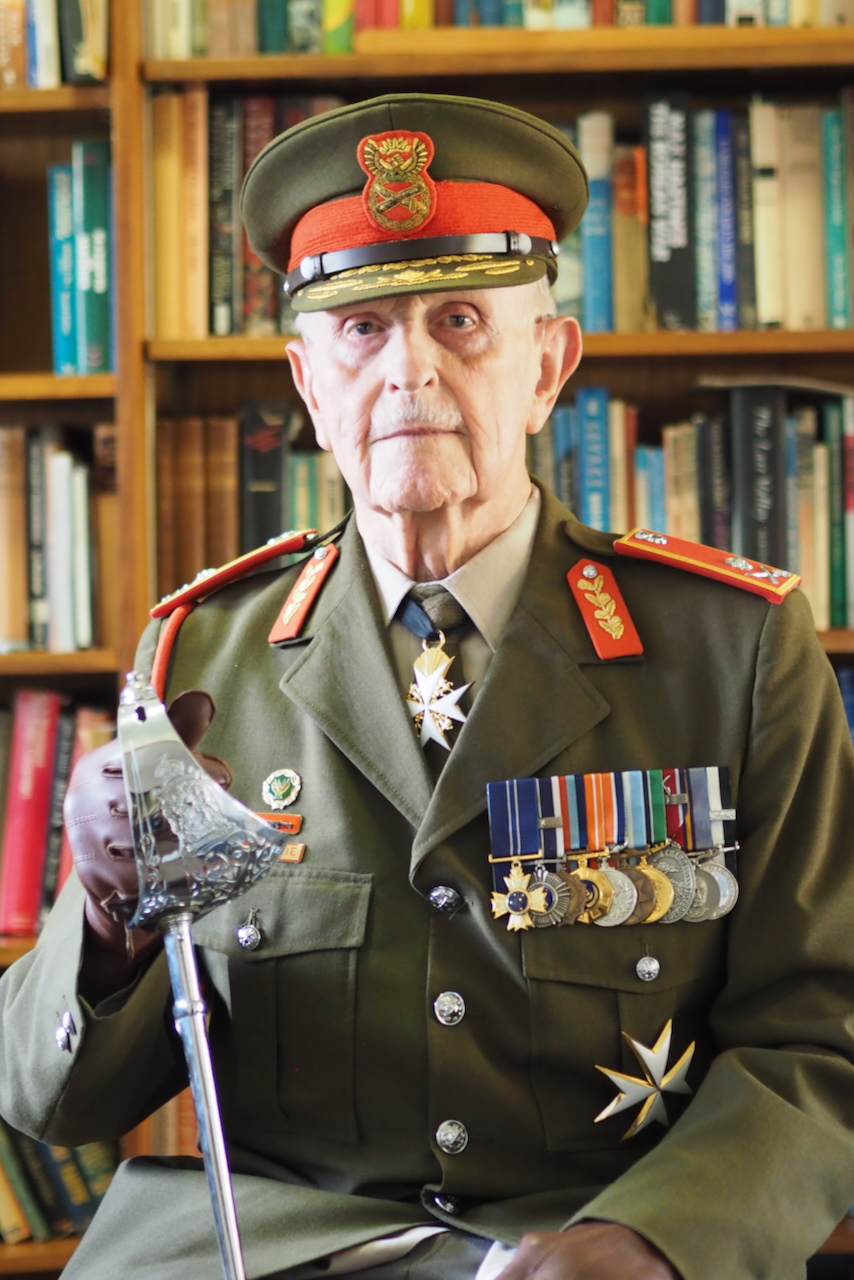
- Brig. Gen. D.F.S. Fourie S.A.N.D.F.
- Born: 17 November 1932; Johannesburg, Transvaal, Union of South Africa
- Died: 10 September 2025 (aged 92); Pretoria, Gauteng, South Africa
- Military career
- Allegiance: South Africa
- Branch: South African Army
- Service years: 1950–1997
- Rank: Brigadier General
- Unit: Pretoria Regiment
- Commands: Chief Defence Reserves; Director Citizen Force Liaison; OC Pretoria Armour Regiment
- Conflicts: South African Border War
- Awards: Venerable Order of Saint John GCStJ Southern Cross Decoration SD Military Merit Medal MMM Pro Patria Medal General Service Medal (South Africa) Unitas (Unity) Medal John Chard Decoration JCD John Chard Medal
- Other work: Professor in Strategic Studies, University of South Africa; Chairman, Heraldry Council; Vice Chancellor of the Priory in South Africa, Order of St John

Deon François Schönland Fourie (17 November 1932 – 10 September 2025) was a South African officer, academic, military historian and heraldist. He served in the South African Defence Force (SADF), where he commanded the Pretoria Armour Regiment from 1975 to 1980, and was later promoted to brigadier general, serving as Director Citizen Force Liaison.

In parallel with his military service, Fourie held a long-standing academic appointment as professor of strategic studies at the University of South Africa (UNISA) from 1968 to 1997.

Fourie was also known for his decades-long voluntary leadership within the Order of St John, serving in national roles including Vice Chancellor of the Priory in South Africa. In recognition of this service, he was appointed a Bailiff Grand Cross of the Order in 2021.

From 1995 to 1997, Fourie chaired the Heraldry Council, a statutory body advising the South African government on heraldic matters.

== Early life and education ==
Fourie was born in Johannesburg and raised in Sabie, Lichtenburg, and Pietersburg (now Polokwane), where he completed his schooling. He later studied at the University of Natal in Durban and the University of the Witwatersrand.

== Military career ==
Fourie began his military service in the South African Army's armoured corps. From 1975 to 1980, he served as Officer Commanding of the Pretoria Armour Regiment. He was later promoted to brigadier general and appointed Director Citizen Force Liaison on the general staff of the SADF.

His military honours include the Southern Cross Decoration, Military Merit Medal, the John Chard Decoration, and the Pro Patria Medal.

== Academic career ==
From 1968 until 1997, Fourie served as professor of strategic studies at the University of South Africa (UNISA) in Pretoria.

== Order of St John ==
In 2021, in recognition of his service to the Order of St John in South Africa including positions as Chair of the Priory Executive Committee, Chair of the Order Affairs Council, and ultimately Vice Chancellor of the Priory in South Africa, Fourie was appointed a Bailiff Grand Cross of the Order of St John, one of the highest grades within the Order.

== Heraldry Council ==
Fourie served as Chairman of the South African Heraldry Council, the statutory body responsible for the approval of coats of arms, badges, and other heraldic representations in South Africa, from 1995 to 1997.

== Death ==
Fourie died on 10 September 2025, at the age of 92.

== Awards and decorations ==
He has been awarded the

- Venerable Order of Saint John (Gr I - Bailiff/Dame Grand Cross) (GCStJ)
- Venerable Order of Saint John (Gr II - Knight of Justice or Grace) (KStJ)
- Southern Cross Decoration (SD)
- Southern Cross Medal (1975) (SM)
- Military Merit Medal (MMM)
- Pro Patria Medal
- General Service Medal (South Africa)
- Unitas (Unity) Medal
- John Chard Decoration (with 40 year clasp) (JCD)
- John Chard Medal
- General Service Medal

== Selected publications ==
Fourie has authored a range of academic papers focusing on South African military history, civil-military relations, and defence policy. Selected works include.

- Fourie, Deon (2013). Decline and Fall: Why the South African Civilian Defence Secretariat Was Dissolved in 1966. Vol. 40. Scientia Militaria. doi:10.5787/40-3-1032.
- Fourie, Deon; Whittle, Marius (2013). Where Fact and Memory Meet: The Amateur Historian's Contribution to Military History. Vol. 58. Historia. ISSN 0018-229X.
- Fourie, Deon (2010). Wensdenkery? Die inburgering van demokratiese militêre waardes in die SA Nasionale Weermag. Journal of Contemporary History. doi:10.38140/sjch.v35i2.79.
- Fourie, Deon (2007). South Africa: The Order of Good Hope. Diplomacy & Statecraft. doi:10.1080/09592290701322630.
- Fourie, Deon (1990). South Africa's developing security and defence policies. RUSI Journal. doi:10.1080/03071849008445434.
- Fourie, Deon (1977). Chimurenga: The War in Rhodesia. Vol. 15. Africa Institute Bulletin.
- Fourie, Deon (1968). War Potentials of the African States South of the Sahara. South African Institute of International Affairs.
