= Heraldry Council =

The Heraldry Council is part of the South African heraldic authority, established in Pretoria in June 1963, in terms of the Heraldry Act. It is the governing and policy-making body for the Bureau of Heraldry and consists of the National Herald ex officio, and other members appointed by the Minister of Arts and Culture.

== History ==
The council's functions were originally defined as: advising the minister and provincial administrators on heraldic matters, approving applications for registration of arms, considering objections to applications, and hearing appeals against rejected applications. In 1969, approval of applications was transferred to the Bureau, and the council's advisory function was changed to one of determining the policy for approving arms.

Policies adopted over the years include:

- the format of family association arms (1966),
- the orientation of helmets to face the same direction as the crests (1982),
- the discontinuation of the use of titles on registration certificates (1988), and
- a moratorium on the registration of crowns and supporters and other additaments relating to foreign titles or ranks (2002).

In the 1980s, the council did the groundwork for the creation of the national orders, and recommended that the dark blue stripe of the then national flag be changed back to its original lighter shade. In 1999, it was consulted on the question of new national arms, but its proposals were turned down in 2000 in favour of a design from a commercial design studio.

== Functions and composition ==
The Heraldry Committee, made up of selected council members and, since 1984, the National Herald ex officio, was originally set up to deal with matters referred to it from time to time. Since 1984, it has also been responsible for considering objections to applications for registration.

The council is usually composed of heraldists, historians, state archivists, artists and, since the mid-1990s, African language specialists and writers.

=== Chairpersons and members ===
1963–1968

- Hon Victor Hiemstra (chairman); Prof Barrie Bierman; Dr Allen Kieser; Ivan Mitford-Barberton; Prof Jacobus Oberholster; Dr Cornelis Pama; Dr Willem Punt.

1968–1975

- Hon Victor Hiemstra (chairman); Prof Barrie Bierman; Dr Allen Kieser; Ivan Mitford-Barberton (1968–72); Prof Jacobus Oberholster; Dr Cornelis Pama; Dr Willem Punt; Maj Frank Waller (1972–75).

1975–1984

- Hon Victor Hiemstra (chairman); Prof Barrie Bierman; Lt Gen Heinrich du Toit; Dr Cornelis Pama; Johann Preller; Prof Hugh Smith; Dr Albert Werth (1975–76); Dr Nico Roos (1976–84).

1984–1989

- Lt Gen Heinrich du Toit (chairman); Ernst de Jong; Hon Christoffel Eloff (1984–88); Prof Ben Hendrickx; Robert Laing; Dr Cornelis Pama; Dr Johannes Snyman; Hon Kees van Dijkhorst (1988–89).

1989–1995

- Lt Gen Heinrich du Toit (chairman); Ernst de Jong; Prof Kobus Ferreira; Prof Deon Fourie; Robert Laing; Dr Johannes Snyman (1989–93); Hon Kees van Dijkhorst; Prof Themba Msimang (1993–95); Frank Nel (1993–95).

1995–1997

- Prof Deon Fourie (chairman); Prof Solomon Chaphole; Ernst de Jong; Prof Kobus Ferreira; Robert Laing; Prof Themba Msimang; Hon Kees van Dijkhorst.

1998–2003

- Prof Themba Msimang (chairman); Mrs Priscilla Broberg; Prof Martin Legassick; Prof Bernard Magubane; Mrs Joan Merrington; Prof Mbulelo Mzamane; Miss Marie Olivier (1998–2000).

2003–2008

- Prof Themba Msimang (chairperson); Mrs Priscilla Broberg; Prof Deon Fourie; Prof Martin Legassick; Prof Bernard Magubane; Dr Marimuthy Govender; Mrs Christina Jikelo; P.M. Malaka; Wonga Tabata.

2008–2011

- No council

2011–2015

- Prof Thenjiwe Miyewa (chairperson); Prof Deon Fourie; Rev Richard Girdwood; Dr Marimuthy Govender; Mrs Christina Jikelo; Dr Peter Martinez; Ms C.T. Mtshali; Dr Joseph Ndaba; Collen Weapond.

== See also ==
- Bureau of Heraldry
