= Coat of arms of the Cape Colony =

Heraldic symbol of the Cape Colony (1875-1910) and Cape Province (1910-1994)

Coat of arms of Cape Colony
- Adopted: 12 May 1875, formally granted 29 May 1876
- Crest: The figure of Hope proper vested Azure, resting the dexter arm on a rock and supporting with the sinister hand an anchor Sable entwined with a cable also proper.
- Shield: Gules, a lion rampant between three annulets Or; on a chief Argent as many hurts each charged with a fleur de lis of the second Or.
- Supporters: Dexter a gnu and sinister an oryx both proper.
- Motto: Spes Bona (Latin) "Good Hope"

The coat of arms of the Cape Colony was the official heraldic symbol of the Cape Colony as a British colony from 1875 to 1910, and as a province of South Africa from 1910 to 1994.

== History ==
The adoption of the arms was a belated response to a British government request, in 1869, for a design for a flag badge to identify the colony. The laying of the foundation stone of the new parliament building in May 1875 was considered as a good opportunity to introduce it. A Cape Town attorney with a keen interest in heraldry, Charles Aken Fairbridge (1824-1893), was accordingly asked to design arms for the Colony.

The foundation stone of the colonial parliament was laid on 12 May 1875. According to the Cape Argus newspaper, "among the conspicuous features of the spectacle was the new colonial flag, hoisted aloft above the cornerstone, with the heraldic shielding, surroundings and mottoes blazoned on the Union Flag and the Royal Standard floating in the breeze from the loftiest flagstaff in the centre".

Queen Victoria formally granted the arms by Royal Warrant a year later, on 29 May 1876.

After the Cape became a province of the Union of South Africa in 1910, the provincial administration took over the arms. They were used as provincial arms until the Cape was divided into three smaller provinces in 1994.

== Blazon ==
The original blazon was:

- Gules, a lion rampant between three annulets Or; on a chief Argent as many hurts each charged with a fleur de lis of the second Or.
- Crest: The figure of Hope proper vested Azure, resting the dexter arm on a rock and supporting with the sinister hand an anchor Sable entwined with a cable also proper.
- Supporters: Dexter a gnu and sinister an oryx both proper.
- Motto: SPES BONA.

The symbolism of the arms is straightforward. The lion is a South African animal, and also appears in the arms of the two colonial powers which ruled at the Cape, Netherlands and Great Britain. The rings were taken from the arms of the founder of the colony, Jan van Riebeeck. The fleur-de-lis represent the contribution of the Huguenots to the early history of the country. The crest is the Lady of Good Hope, grasping an anchor, first introduced as a symbol of the colony in 1715. The supporters, a gnu (wildebeest) and an oryx (gemsbok), are two typical South African animals. The motto, "Spes Bona" simply means "Good Hope".

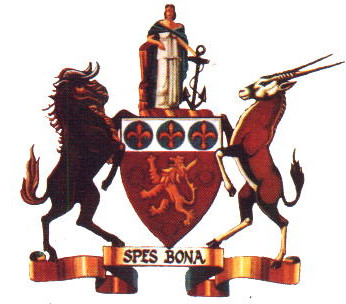
Version with redesigned crest

New artwork was introduced in 1952. Hope's dress was changed to white, and she was given a blue mantle. The arms were recorded in this format the College of Arms in July 1955 and registered at the Bureau of Heraldry in 1967.

== See also ==
- Coat of arms of Natal
- Coat of arms of the Orange Free State
- Coat of arms of the Orange River Colony
- Coat of arms of South Africa
- Coat of arms of the Transvaal
- South African heraldry
