= Frederick Brownell =

South African herald, vexillologist and genealogist (1940–2019)

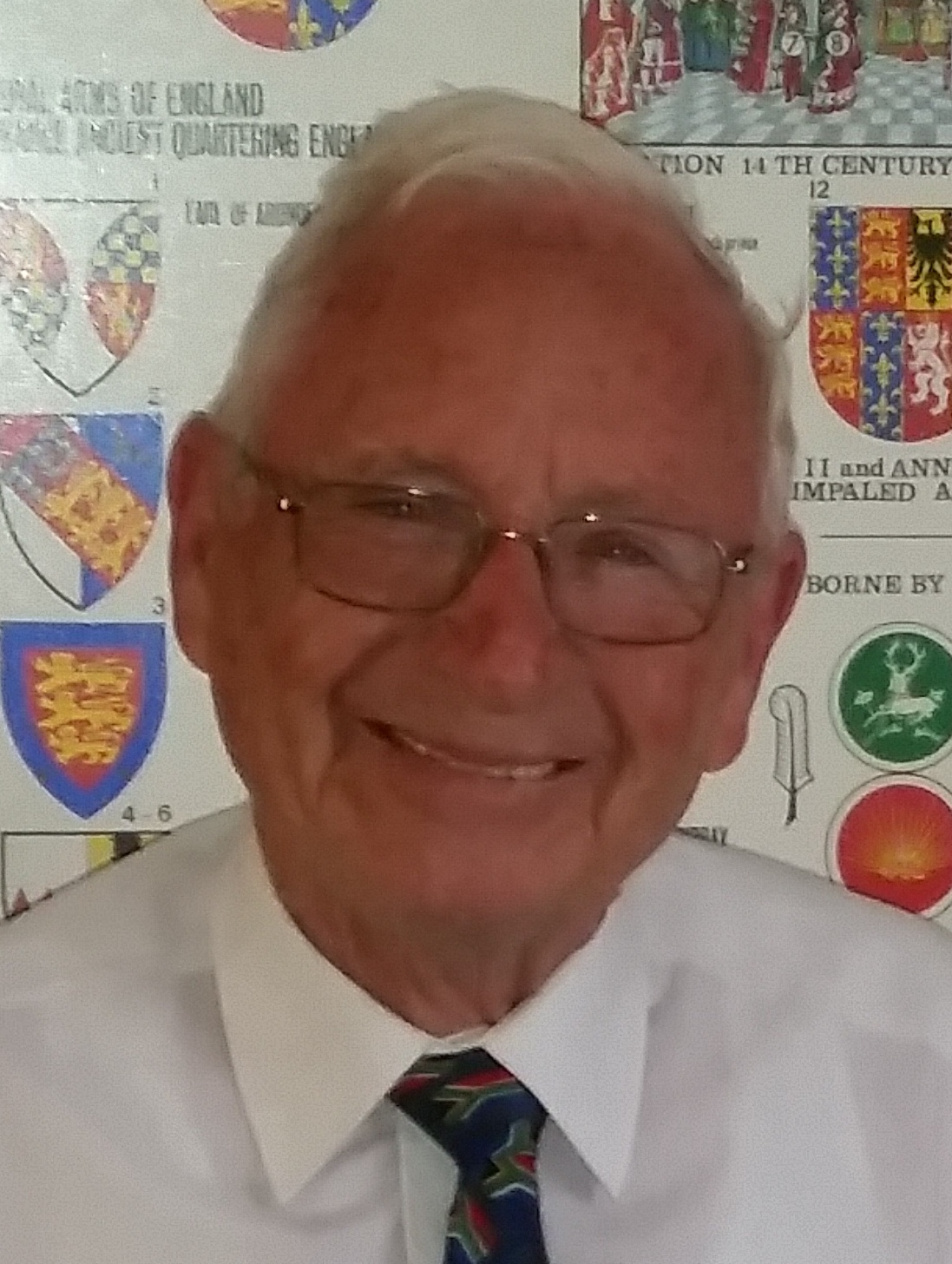
- Born: Frederick Gordon Brownell; 8 March 1940; Bethlehem, Orange Free State, South Africa
- Died: 10 May 2019 (aged 79); Newlands, Pretoria, Gauteng, South Africa
- Education: Rhodes University; University of South Africa; University of Pretoria
- Occupation: State Herald of South Africa (1982–2002)
- Known for: Designing the flags of Namibia and South Africa

Frederick Gordon Brownell OMSS SM & Bar MMM KStJ (8 March 1940 – 10 May 2019) was a South African herald, vexillologist, and genealogist.

The South African national flag, introduced in 1994, is generally credited to State Herald Frederick Brownell.

== Family and early life ==
Brownell was born in Bethlehem, in what was then the Orange Free State province in South Africa on 8 March 1940. He matriculated from St. Andrew's School in Bloemfontein in 1957. He undertook his voluntary military service at the Air Force Gymnasium with 1 Motorboat Squadron (Air-Sea rescue) before going to Rhodes University in Grahamstown to read for a Bachelor of Arts degree in History and Social Anthropology, which he obtained in 1961. He subsequently completed an Honours degree in history at the University of South Africa in 1965 and was awarded a Master of Arts degree (with distinction) from the same university in 1977 for a dissertation entitled "British Immigration to South Africa 1946 – 1970".

He married Christine de Villiers, whom he met whilst at Rhodes University, on 29 September 1962 in Pretoria and together they had three daughters.

== Career ==
Brownell joined the Department of Immigration on 2 January 1962 as an Administrative Officer. His responsibilities included a tour of duty as Assistant Attache (Immigration) and Consul to the South African Embassy in London between 1965 and 1969.

He then joined the Department of National Education / later Arts, Culture, Science and Technology as Assistant State Herald in the Bureau of Heraldry on 1 August 1977. He was promoted to State Herald on 1 May 1982 and retired from that position in 2002.

Brownell designed many coats of arms, badges and flags, including the arms and the flag of Namibia in 1990. In 1993/1994, he designed the current South African flag, with a three-armed converging cross of the sort called a pall in heraldry, to symbolise the convergence of different cultures into one for the future South Africa. He later designed arms for the new provincial governments in South Africa. He was awarded the Order for Meritorious Service by President Nelson Mandela in 2000 for his role in the design of the South African flag and the Vexillon Award for excellence in the promotion of vexillology in 1995 and 2015, the only recipient to have won it twice. He also published many articles and several books on heraldry and flags. He was also involved in the field of honours and awards.

=== Final years and death ===
Shortly after his retirement Brownell and his wife moved to the Newlands Park retirement home, south east of Pretoria. He continued to be an active member of the Southern African Vexillological Association and completed the SAVA Journal series on South African Military Colours (1664 to 26 April 1994). Furthermore, in September 2015 he was awarded the degree of Doctorate of Philosophy (D.Phil.) in the Faculty of Humanities at the University of Pretoria for a dissertation entitled Convergence and Unification: The National Flag of South Africa (1994) in Historical Perspective, based on the process of, and his role in, the designing the current South African flag.

In early 2019, he was diagnosed with pancreatic cancer. He died at his home surrounded by his family on 10 May 2019.

== Awards and Commendations ==
Brownell was the recipient of the following:

- Order for Meritorious Service (OMSS), Class II: Silver
- Southern Cross Medal (1975) (SM) and bar
- Military Merit Medal (MMM)
- General Service Medal
- Unitas Medal
- John Chard Decoration (JCD)
- Republic of Venda Police Star of Merit
- Republic of Venda Prison's Service Establishment Medal
- Knight of the Most Venerable Order of the Hospital of St. John of Jerusalem (KStJ)
- Cross of Merit of Robert Caluwe (instituted by the Heraldic Societies in the Baltic region for services to international heraldry)
- Gold Commemorative Medallion of the South West Africa Territory Force
- William Harvey Medal of the South African Blood Transfusion Service
- Archives News Literary Prize (1990)
- Vexillon Award of the International Federation of Vexillological Associations (1995 and 2015)
- Fellow of the International Federation of Vexillological Associations (FF)
- Fiat Lux Award by the family of St. Andrew's School (Bloemfontein)
- South African National Defence Force Emblem for Voluntary Service
- Honorary Life Member of the Southern African Vexillological Association
- Laureate of the International Federation of Vexillological Associations (LF)

== Publications ==
Brownell's works include:

=== Books ===
- National and provincial symbols and flora and fauna emblems of the Republic of South Africa. C. van Rensburg Publications. 1993. ISBN 978-0-86846-074-1.
- Nasionale en Provinsiale Simbole en Flora- en Fauna-embleme van die Republiek van Suid-Afrika, C. van Rensburg Publications. 1993 ISBN 9780868460758
- National symbols of the Republic of South Africa, Chris van Rensburg Publications, 1995
- British Immigration to South Africa, 1946–1970. Government Printer. 1985.
- The South African Armorial, a computerised register of arms, badges, flags etc. registered under the Heraldry Act, Vols. I to VIII (1987–2001). 1987. ISBN 9780797012509.
- Heraldry in the Church of the Province of Southern Africa, 1847–2000: coats of arms of the dioceses, collegiate and parish churches, and the Order of Ethiopia. Heraldsholme CC. 2002. ISBN 978-0-620-28606-0.
- Consolidated index to the South African Armorial (1989, 1990, 1992, 1997, 2001)
- Index to local and regional authorities which have registered arms, badges and seals with the Bureau of Heraldry (1990, 1991, 1997)
- Alphabetical index to South African Defence Force heraldic representations registered with the Bureau of Heraldry (1991, 1997, 2000)
- Names, Uniforms and Badges – a computerised record of the registrations under the Protection of Names, Uniforms and Badges Act, 1935, Vols. 1 – 4 (2000)
- Saint Augustine's Church, Bethlehem. Andrew Mann (self-published). 2026. ISBN 979-8-234-14957-2.

=== Journal articles and reports ===
- Report on the Transformation of National Orders in South Africa, co-authored with Dr Y Muthien and General L Moloi, 1998
- South African Military Colours – 1664 to 26 April 1994 Part II Vol.1 – Military Colours of the Union Defence Forces and of the South African Defence Force : 1 July 1912 to 30 May 1961, co-authored with Prof H H Smith, SAVA Journal SJ: 8/99, December 1999 ISBN 0-620-30685-8
- South African Military Colours – 1664 to 26 April 1994 Part II Vol.2 – Military Colours of the Union Defence Forces and of the South African Defence Force : 1 July 1912 to 30 May 1961 : Colours devised for the Commandos of the South African Defence Forces prior to World War II, co-authored with Prof H H Smith, SAVA Journal SJ:9, July 2005 ISBN 0-620-34701-5
- South African Military Colours – 1664 to 26 April 1994 Part III Vol. 1 – Military Colours of the South African Defence Force 31 May 1961 to 26 April 1994 : The National Colour and Colours devised for the South African Army, co-authored with Prof H H Smith, SAVA Journal SJ:10, June 2011 ISBN 978-0-620-50804-9
- South African Military Colours – 1664 to 26 April 1994 Part III Vol. 2 – Military Colours of the South African Defence Force 31 May 1961 to 26 April 1994 : Colours devised for the South African Air Force, Navy, Medical Service and the South African Police, co-authored with Prof H H Smith, SAVA Journal SJ:11, December 2017 ISBN 978-0-6399231-0-9
- The Union Jack over Southern and Central Africa, 1795 – 1994, SAVA Journal SJ: 3/94, October 1994 ISBN 0-620-18833-2
- Some Southern African Flags, 1949 – 1991, SAVA Journal SJ: 1/92, April 1992 ISBN 0-620-16598-7
- Symbolism in the coats of arms of Special Schools for the Cerebral Palsied, in Education and Culture, II, 2, June 1978
- The Bureau of Heraldry, its establishment, functions and procedures, in Education and Culture, V, I, March/June 1982
- Heraldry in South Africa, in Optima, Vol. 32, 4, December 1984 (subsequently reprinted in The New Zealand Armiger, 18, December 1990)
- Finnish Influence on South African Heraldic Design, in the Proceedings of the 16th International Congress of Genealogical and Heraldic Sciences, Helsinki, 1984
- Historic Flags of South Africa, in the Report of the 11th International Congress of Vexillology, Madrid, 1985
- Heraldry in Natal, in Natalia, 17, December 1987
- New Southern African Flags, in the Proceedings of the 12th International Congress of Vexillology, 1987, published in The Flag Bulletin, XVIII, 1 – 4/130, Jan – Aug 1990
- The Evolution of the Coat of Arms and Flags of South West Africa and Namibia, published in 8 parts in Archives News, XXXII, 11 May 1990 – XXXIII, 6, December 1990
- Kruger Gray's bookplate for South Africa House, London, in Africana Society of Pretoria, Yearbook 8, 1990
- Symbols for Namibia, in The Flag Bulletin, XXXI, 1 – 2/145, Jan – April 1992
- Heraldic adaptation in the Southern African context, in Genealogica & Heraldica, the Proceedings of the 20th International Congress of Genealogical and Heraldic Sciences, Uppsala, 1992
- The flags of the Diggers' Republic, in Fahnen Flags Drapeaux, the Proceedings of the 15th International Congress of Vexillology, Zurich, 1993
- Some Bookplates in the Brenthurst Library, in Brenthurst Archives, I, 1, 1994
- The design of the new South African national flag, SABS Bulletin, XIII, 3, May/June 1994 (subsequently reprinted in the Journal of the Dental Association of South Africa, Vol. 49, II, November 1994)
- Creating an interim flag for South Africa, in The Flag Bulletin, XXXIII, 3/158, May – June 1994 (co-authored with B B Berry, D de Waal and T Stylianides)
- The evolution of a distinctive South African heraldic idiom, 1963–1996, in Genealogica & Heraldica, the Proceedings of the 22nd International Congress of Genealogical and Heraldic Sciences, Ottawa, 1996
- The Cartoonist's view of the South African National Flag, in Flags in Southern Africa and the World, the Proceedings of the 17th International Congress of Vexillology, Cape Town, 1997 ISBN 0 620 24397 X
- The Seal of the Republic of South Africa – a little oversight?, in Arma (New Series), Vol. 4, 1–2, December 1998
- Flags of the Uniformed and other services in the former African 'Homelands' of South Africa, in Flags from Sea to Sea, the Proceedings of the 18th International Congress of Vexillology, Victoria, British Columbia, 1999

== See also ==
- Bureau of Heraldry, South Africa
- International Congress of Genealogical and Heraldic Sciences
- International Congress of Vexillology
- Southern African Vexillological Association

== Sources ==
- Arma Vol 7 No 1 (2002)
- Beckett, Denis (2002). Flying with Pride: The Story of the South African Flag. WildNet Africa. ISBN 978-0-620-28903-0.
- Faulkner, Donna (2014). Mandela. New Word City. ISBN 978-1-61230-749-7.

Heraldic offices
Preceded by Norden Hartman	State Herald of South Africa; 1982–2002	Succeeded by Themba Mabaso
