= Coat of arms of the Orange River Colony =

Escutcheon

Orange River Colony coat of arms
- Adopted: 10 December 1904

The coat of arms of the Orange River Colony was the official heraldic symbol of the Orange River Colony as a British colony from 1904 to 1910, and then of the Orange Free State province of South Africa from 1910 to 1925. It is now obsolete.

== History ==
The Orange Free State republic became a British colony at the end of the Anglo-Boer War in May 1902. The republic's official arms were discontinued, and on 10 December 1904, by Royal Warrant, King Edward VII granted a new coat of arms to the colony. The springbok was chosen as the principal charge in the arms. Although it had made its appearance in heraldry nearly thirty years earlier (in the crest of the arms granted to Edward Randles of Port Natal in 1875), this appears to have been the first time that the animal was used as a charge on a shield.

When the colony became a province of the Union of South Africa in 1910, the provincial administration took over the arms, which it used until 1925. In 1937, after a twelve-year period without official arms, the provincial administration adopted the old republican arms, which were used as the provincial arms until the Orange Free State was reconstituted as the Free State Province in 1994.

== Blazon ==
The official blazon is:

Argent, on a mound a springbuck and on a chief Azure the Imperial Crown all proper.

== See also ==
- Coat of arms of the Cape Colony
- Coat of arms of Natal
- Coat of arms of the Orange Free State
- Coat of arms of South Africa
- Coat of arms of the Transvaal
- South African heraldry
