= Coenraad Beyers =

South African historian, archivist, and herald

Dr Coenraad Beyers (1893–1975) was a South African historian, archivist, and herald.

He joined the State Archives in 1927, and was Chief Archivist from 1944 until he retired in 1953.

In 1956, he served on the official committee appointed to investigate the practical aspects of setting up an heraldic authority. In 1959, he was appointed the head of the Heraldry Section established by the Department of Education, Arts & Sciences to manage official arms and flags, and register the arms and badges of associations and institutions.

When this section was superseded by the Bureau of Heraldry in 1963, he served as the first State Herald. He stepped down in 1964 to become the Bureau's senior professional officer, and retired finally in 1971.

== See also ==
- Bureau of Heraldry

Heraldic offices
New office	State Herald of South Africa; 1963–1964	Succeeded by Norden Hartman
