= Coat of arms of South Africa =

- Armiger: Republic of South Africa
- Adopted: 27 April 2000; 26 years ago
- Shield: Arms: Or, representations of two San human figures of red ochre, statant respectant, the hands of the innermost arms clasped, with upper arm, inner wrist, waist and knee bands Argent, and a narrow border of red ochre; the shield ensigned of a spear and knobkierie in saltire, Sable. Thereabove a demi-secretary bird displayed Or, charged on the breast with a stylized representation of a protea flower with outer petals Vert, inner petals Or and seeded of nine triangles conjoined in three rows, the upper triangle Gules, the second row Vert, Or inverted and Vert, and the third row Vert, Or inverted, Sable, Or inverted and Vert. Above the head of the secretary bird an arc of seven rays facetted Or and Orange, the two outer rays conjoined to the elevated wings. Upon a riband Vert, the motto !KE E:/XARRA //KE in letters Argent. Issuant from the ends of the riband two pairs of elephant tusks curving inwards, the tips conjoined to the wings of the secretary bird, Or, therewithin and flanking the shields, two ears of wheat Brunatré.
- Motto: ǃke e꞉ ǀxarra ǁke "Diverse People Unite" in |Xam
- Use: Pronunciation of the South African Motto Pronunciation of the South African Motto. Recorded September 21, 2024

The coat of arms of South Africa is the main heraldic insignia of South Africa. The present coat of arms was introduced on Freedom Day, 27 April 2000, and was designed by Iaan Bekker. It replaced the earlier national arms, which had been in use since 1910. The motto is written in the extinct ǀXam, a member of the Khoisan languages, and translates literally to "diverse people unite". The previous motto, in Latin, was Ex Unitate Vires, translated as "Unity is strength "

== History ==
Following the end of apartheid, the new constitution of South Africa initially retained the coat of arms granted to South Africa in 1910. However, they had been viewed as outdated due to being designed by the British and Afrikaner minorities and not being representative of the black majority. The design process for a new coat of arms was initiated in 1999, the Department of Arts, Culture, Science and Technology requested ideas for the new coat of arms from the public. A brief was then prepared based on the ideas received, along with input from the Cabinet. The Government Communication and Information System then approached Design South Africa to brief ten of the top designers. Three designers were chosen to present their concepts to the Cabinet, and Iaan Bekker's design was chosen.

The new arms were introduced on Freedom Day, 27 April 2000. The change reflected the government's aim to highlight the democratic change in South Africa and a new sense of patriotism.

The coat of arms is a series of elements organized in distinct symmetric egg-like or oval shapes placed on top of one another. The completed structure of the coat of arms combines the lower and higher oval shape in a symbol of infinity. The path that connects the lower edge of the scroll, through the lines of the tusks, with the horizon above and the sun rising at the top, forms the shape of the cosmic egg from which the secretary bird rises. In the symbolic sense, this is the implied rebirth of the spirit of the great and heroic nation of South Africa.

The coat of arms is also a central part of the Seal of the Republic, traditionally considered to be the highest emblem of the state. Absolute authority is given to every document with an impression of the Seal of the Republic on it, as this means that it has been approved by the president of South Africa. Since 1997, however, the use of the Seal of the Republic has not actually been required by the Constitution, but it continues to be used.

=== Boer Republics ===
Transvaal Republic

Orange Free State

Republic of Stellaland

Nieuwe Republiek

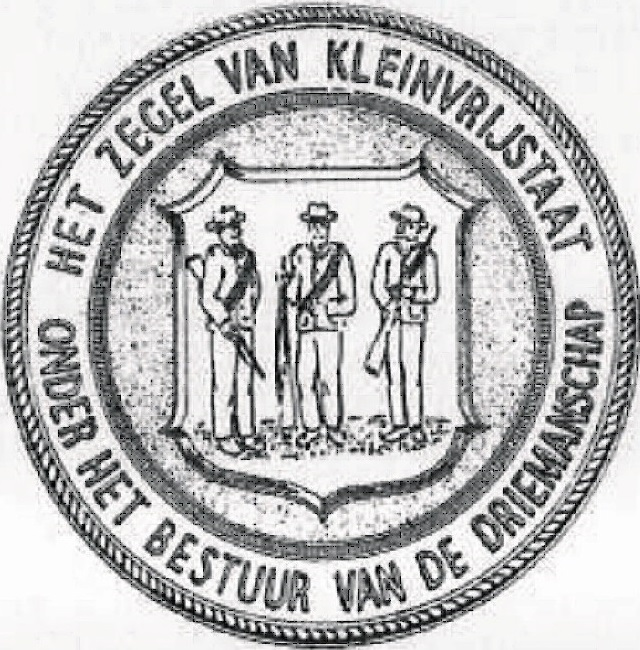
Klein Vrystaat

=== Colonies ===
Transvaal Colony

Orange River Colony

Colony of Natal

Cape Colony

=== Bantustans ===
Bophuthatswana

Ciskei

Gazankulu

KaNgwane

KwaNdebele

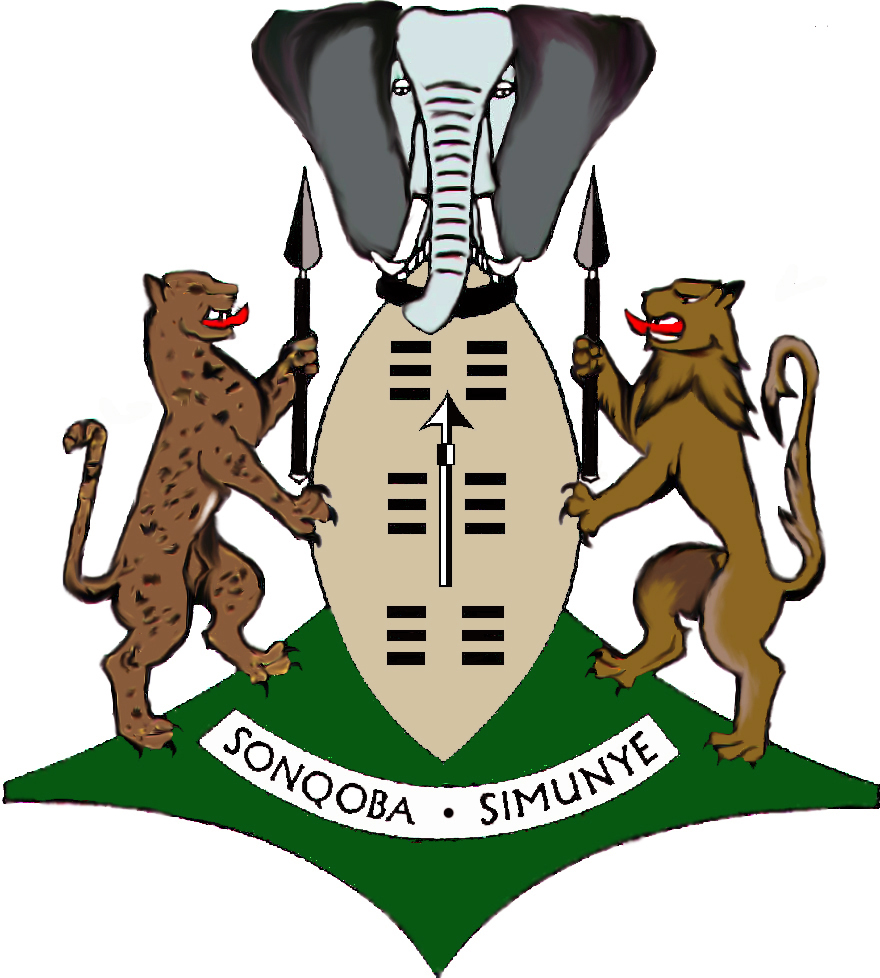
KwaZulu

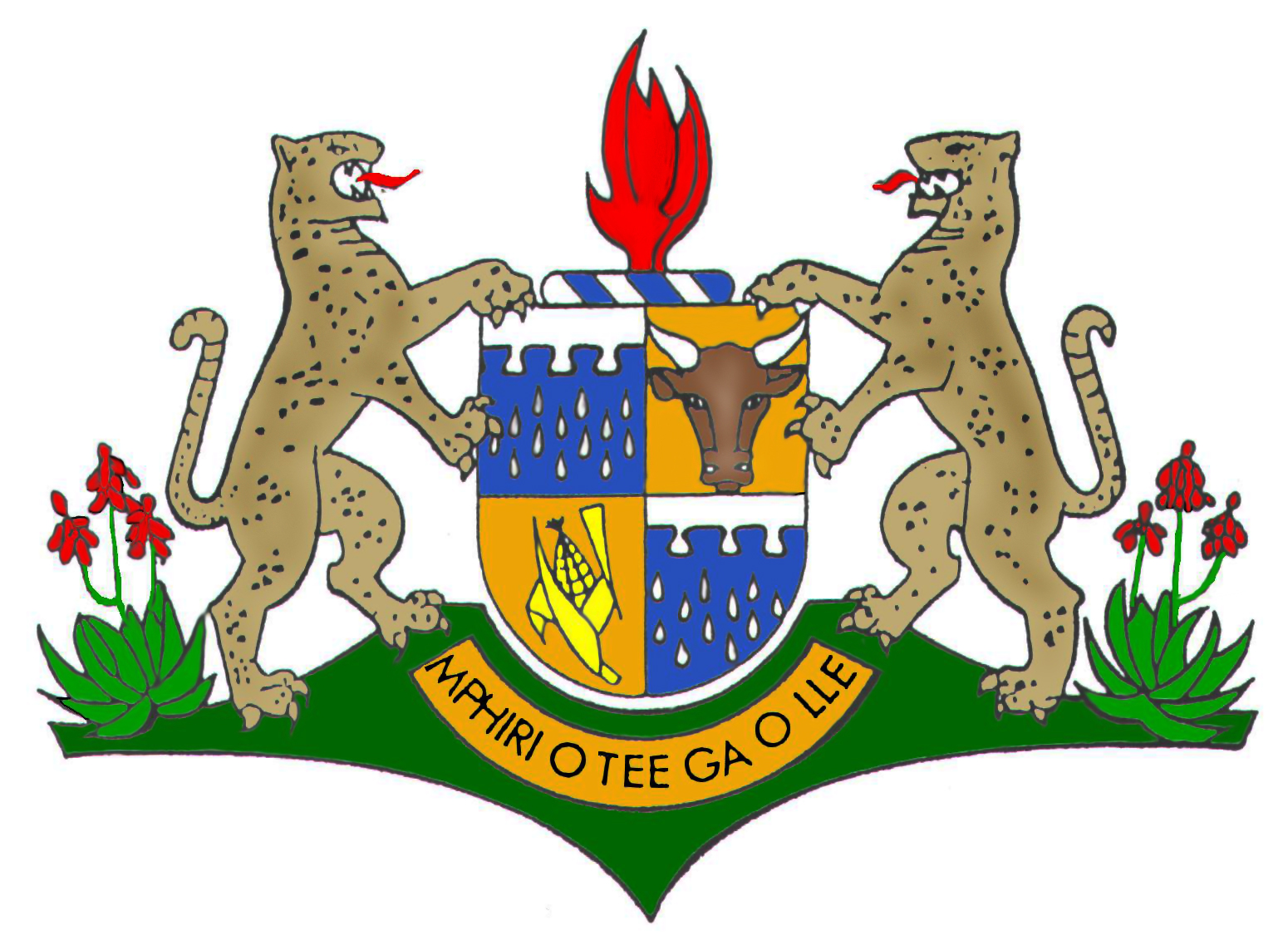
Lebowa

QwaQwa

Transkei

Venda

== Blazon ==
The official blazon of the arms is:

Or, representations of two San human figures of red ochre, statant respectant, the hands of the innermost arms clasped, with upper arm, inner wrist, waist and knee bands Argent, and a narrow border of red ochre; the shield ensigned of a spear and knobkierie in saltire, Sable. Thereabove a demi-secretary bird displayed Or, charged on the breast with a stylised representation of a protea flower with outer petals Vert, inner petals Or and seeded of nine triangles conjoined in three rows, the upper triangle Gules, the second row Vert, Or inverted and Vert, and the third row Vert, Or inverted, Sable, Or inverted and Vert. Above the head of the secretary bird an arc of seven rays facetted Or and Orange, the two outer rays conjoined to the elevated wings. Upon a riband Vert, the motto ǃKE E꞉ ǀXARRA ǁKE in letters Argent. Issuant from the ends of the riband two pairs of elephant tusks curving inwards, the tips conjoined to the wings of the secretary bird, Or, therewithin and flanking the shields, two ears of wheat Brunatré.

=== The oval shape of foundation ===
The first element is the motto, in a green semicircle. Completing the semicircle are two symmetrically placed pairs of elephant tusks pointing upwards. Within the oval shape formed by the tusks are two symmetrical ears of wheat, that in turn frame a centrally placed gold shield.

The shape of the shield makes reference to the drum, and contains two human figures derived from Khoisan rock art Linton Stone, which is housed and displayed in the Iziko South African Museum in Cape Town. The figures are depicted facing one another in greeting and in unity.

Above the shield are a spear and a knobkierie, crossed in a single unit. These elements are arranged harmoniously to give focus to the shield and complete the lower oval shape of foundation.

- The motto

Pronunciation of the South African Motto
Pronunciation of the South African Motto.
Recorded 21 September 2024

The motto is: ǃke e꞉ ǀxarra ǁke, written in the Khoisan language of the ǀXam people, literally meaning "diverse people unite". It addresses each individual effort to harness the unity between thought and action. On a collective scale it calls for the nation to unite in a common sense of belonging and national pride – unity in diversity.

- The ears of wheat

An emblem of fertility, it also symbolises the idea of germination, growth and the feasible development of any potential. It relates to the nourishment of the people and signifies the agricultural aspects of the Earth.

- Elephant tusks

Elephants symbolise wisdom, strength, moderation and eternity.

- The shield

It has a dual function as a vehicle for the display of identity and of spiritual defence. It contains the primary symbol of our nation.

- The human figures

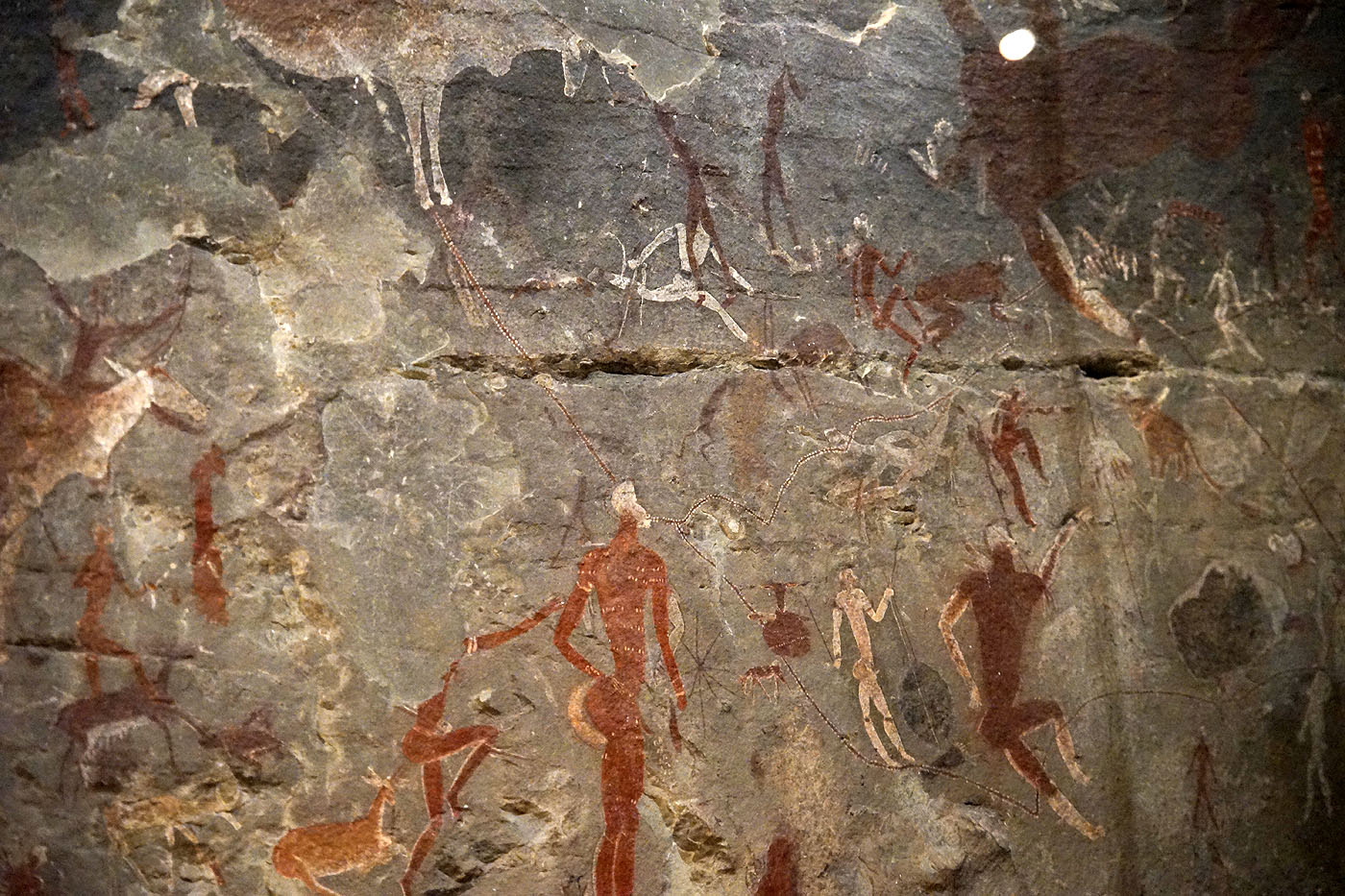
The Linton Panel, a famous San rock art displayed at the Iziko South African Museum; used as inspiration for the human figures on the shield.

The figures are depicted in an attitude of greeting, symbolising unity. This also represents the beginning of the individual's transformation into the greater sense of belonging to the nation and by extension, collective humanity.

- The spear and knobkierie

A dual symbol of defence and authority, they in turn represent the powerful legs of the secretary bird. The spear and knobkierie are lying down, symbolising peace.

=== The oval shape of ascendance ===
Immediately above the oval shape of foundation, is the visual centre of the coat of arms, a protea. The petals of the protea are rendered in a triangular pattern reminiscent of the crafts of Africa.

The secretary bird is placed above the protea and the flower forms the chest of the bird. The secretary bird stands with its wings uplifted in a regal and uprising gesture. The distinctive head feathers of the secretary bird crown a strong and vigilant head. The rising sun above the horizon is placed between the wings of the secretary bird and completes the oval shape of ascendance.

- The King protea

The protea is an emblem of the beauty of our land and the flowering of our potential as a nation in pursuit of the African Renaissance. The protea symbolises the holistic integration of forces that grow from the Earth and are nurtured from above. The most popular colours of Africa have been assigned to the protea – green, gold, red and black.

- The secretary bird

The secretary bird is characterised in flight, the natural consequence of growth and speed. It is the equivalent of the lion on Earth. A powerful bird whose legs – depicted as the spear and knobkierie – serve it well in its hunt for snakes, symbolising protection of the nation against its enemies. It is a messenger of the heavens and conducts its grace upon the Earth. In this sense it is a symbol of divine majesty. Its uplifted wings are an emblem of the ascendance of our nation, while simultaneously offering us its protection. It is depicted in gold, which clearly symbolises its association with the sun and the highest power.

- The rising sun

An emblem of brightness, splendour and the supreme principle of the nature of energy. It symbolises the promise of rebirth, the active faculties of reflection, knowledge, good judgement and willpower. It is the symbol of the source of life, of light and the ultimate wholeness of humanity.

== 1910 arms ==
The first coat of arms was granted by King George V by royal warrant on 17 September 1910. This was a few months after the formation of the Union of South Africa.

It was a combination of symbols representing the four provinces (formerly colonies) that made up the Union.

- The first quarter is the figure of Hope, representing the Colony of the Cape of Good Hope.
- The two wildebeests of the second quarter represent the Colony of Natal.
- The orange tree in the third quarter was used as the symbol of the Orange Free State Republic.
- The wagon in the fourth quarter represented the Transvaal.
- The supporters are taken from the arms of the Orange River Colony and the Cape Colony.
- The lion holds four rods, bound together, symbolising the unification of the four former colonies.

The motto, Ex Unitate Vires was officially translated as "Union is Strength" until 1961, and thereafter as "Unity is Strength".

=== Evolution ===
Three official renditions of the arms were used. The original rendition (1910) was the only version used until 1930, and it continued to be used as the rank badge of warrant officers in the South African Defence Force and South African National Defence Force until 2002. The second version, painted in 1930 and known as the "ordinary coat of arms", and the third version, painted in 1932 and known as the "embellished coat of arms", were both used until 2000. The former was also used on the insignia of the South African Police until the 1990s.

1910	1930	1932

== Provincial arms ==
=== 1910–1994 ===
Between 1910 and 1994, South Africa was divided into four provinces, Cape Province, Natal, Orange Free State and Transvaal. These provinces had their own coat of arms.

Coat of arms of Cape Province

Coat of arms of Orange Free State

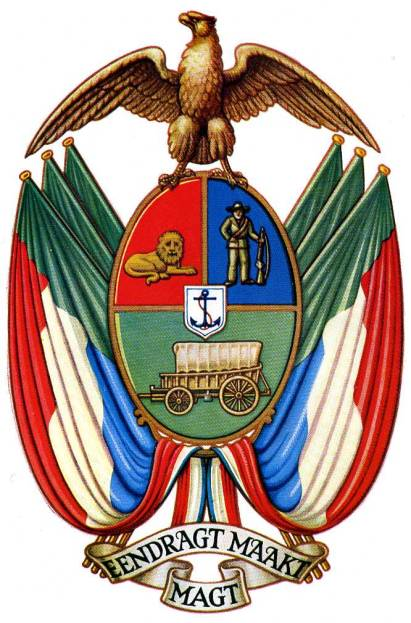
Coat of arms of Transvaal

Coat of arms of Natal

=== 1994–present ===
In April 1994, South Africa was divided into nine provinces. Each province was granted a coat of arms, in most cases designed by State Herald Frederick Brownell.

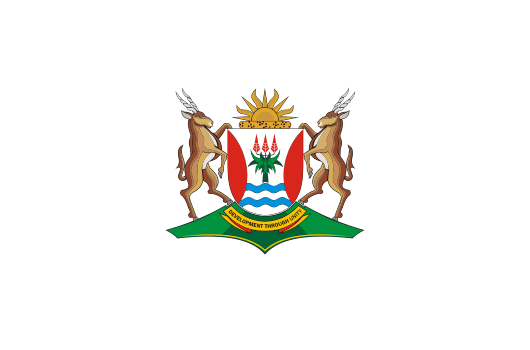
Coat of arms of Eastern Cape

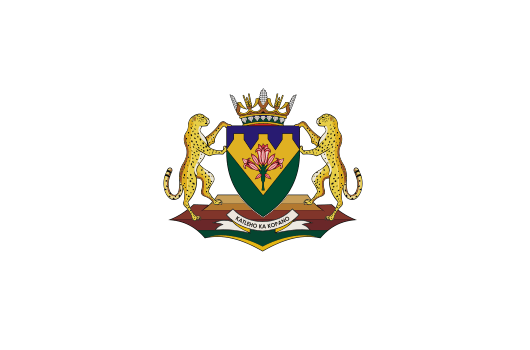
Coat of arms of Free State Province

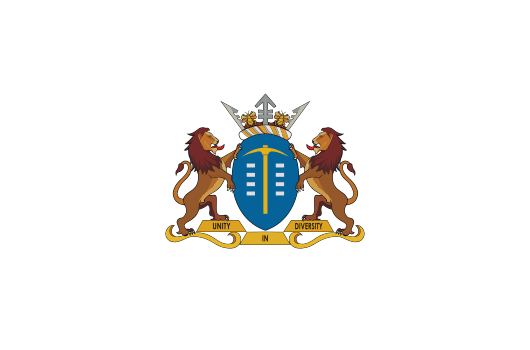
Coat of arms of Gauteng

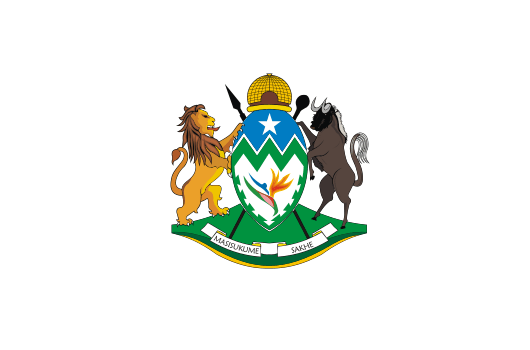
Coat of arms of KwaZulu-Natal

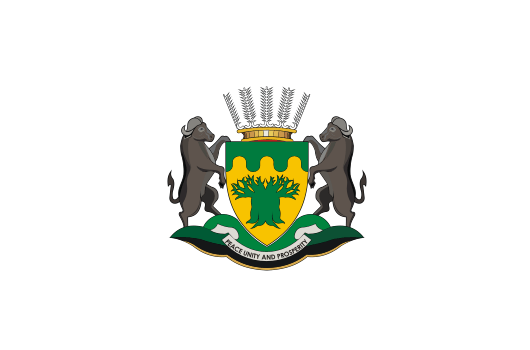
Coat of arms of Limpopo

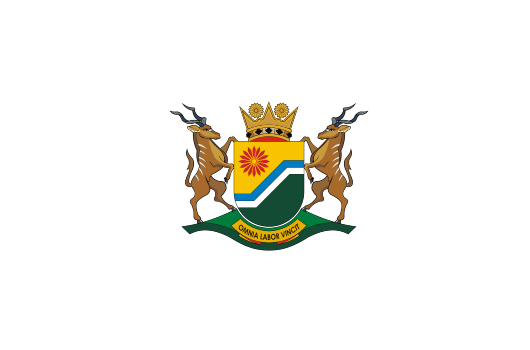
Coat of arms of Mpumalanga

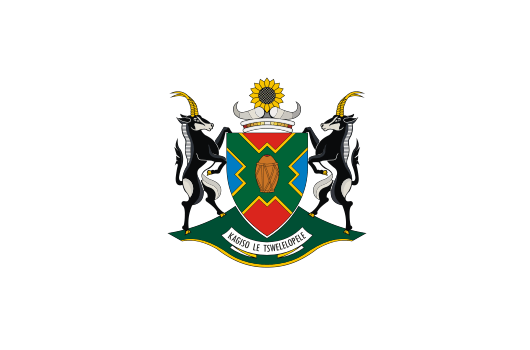
Coat of arms of North West Province

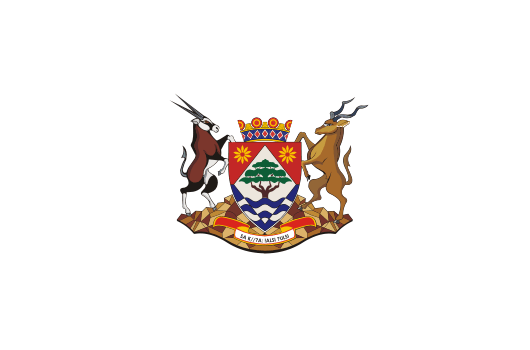
Coat of arms of Northern Cape

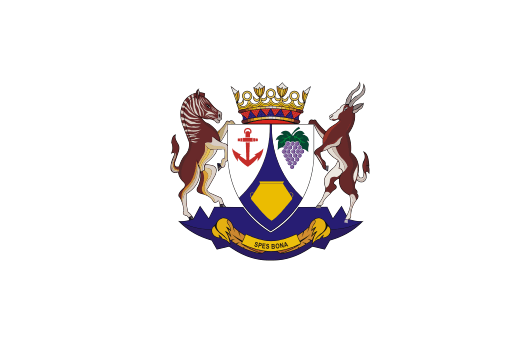
Coat of arms of Western Cape

== See also ==
- South African heraldry
- Coat of arms of the Orange Free State
- Coat of arms of the Cape Colony
- Coat of arms of Natal
- Coat of arms of the Transvaal
- Coat of arms of the Orange River Colony
