= Bureau of Heraldry =

South African authority for heraldry

- Coat of arms of the Bureau of Heraldry
- Heraldic tradition: Dutch
- Jurisdiction: South Africa
- Governing body: Heraldry Council
- Chief officer: Themba Mabaso, State Herald

The Bureau of Heraldry is the South African heraldic authority, established in Pretoria on 1 June 1963. It is headed by a State Herald (known unofficially as the National Herald since 2004) and its functions are to register arms, badges, flags and seals (as well as names and uniforms), to keep a public register, to issue registration certificates and, since 1980, to advise the government on heraldic matters. Together with the Heraldry Council, it forms part of the National Archives and Records Service (formerly called the State Archives Service), which is currently under the authority of the Minister of Sports, Arts and Culture.

== Purposes ==
Under South African law, everyone has the right to bear a coat of arms as he pleases, as long as he does not infringe on the rights of others (i.e. the arms are not too similar to arms already in use by someone else) and the proposed arms conform to basic heraldic principles. The State Herald approves of and registers arms under the authority given by the Heraldry Act. (Note: This process is in substance no different from that used by the Republic of Ireland, wherein the authority of the Chief Herald of Ireland is vested in the Irish Government through the National Library of Ireland. The Chief Herald of Ireland is an employee of the National Library of Ireland. The College of Arms in London is a private corporation operating throughout England and Wales and Northern Ireland under the jurisdiction/authority of the Crown of the United Kingdom and forming part of the Royal Household. The Canadian Heraldic Authority, financed by the Canadian Government, operates under the direct supervision of the King of Canada via the Office of the King's representative, the Governor General. The Lord Lyon of Scotland has direct control of the assignation of Arms in Scotland.)

In addition to registering coats of arms, badges, and other heraldic devices, the Bureau maintains records of names, uniforms, and badges—including some corporate arms—that were previously registered by the Department of the Interior (1935–1959) and the Department of Education, Arts and Sciences (1959–1963). Anyone, regardless of nationality or place of residence, may apply to register arms with the Bureau, which since 1980 has also been authorised to register the arms of official bodies in foreign countries.

Originally, applications required approval from the Heraldry Council before registration could proceed. In 1969, this authority was delegated to the State Herald, although he retained the option of referring applications to the council—or, from 1980 onward, to its Heraldry Committee—when necessary. In 1980, the National Herald was further empowered to remove arms from the register, either at the request of the applicant or, in the case of official, municipal, or corporate arms, when the relevant organisation had ceased to exist. Appeals against the National Herald's decisions can be made to the Heraldry Committee.

In the 1970s, the Bureau registered between 60 and 90 arms and badges per year. The number increased sharply in the mid-1980s, reaching a peak of 148 in the 1987–88 reporting year. It declined in the early 1990s, and returned to 1970s levels. (These figures do not include the registrations of defence force unit arms and insignia, of which the Bureau has registered more than 1000 since the 1960s.)

The illustrated blazons (written descriptions in technical terms) of applications for registration are published in the South African Government Gazette. Blazons (but not illustrations) of arms registered at the Bureau and its predecessors up to the end of the year 2000 are available online through the National Archives website.

Naturally, the Bureau itself has a coat of arms which were adopted in 1965. The blazon is Azure, three escutcheons Or, on a chief of the second the South African lion. In layman's language this means that the shield is blue, it displays three smaller golden shields, and across the top is a gold horizontal strip displaying the red lion that formed the crest of the old South African national coat of arms. The Bureau arms are depicted on the seal on each registration certificate and, in the 1960s and early 1970s, they were depicted in full colour at the head of the certificate too.

== National Herald and staff ==
The State Herald (called unofficially the National Herald since 2004) is a civil servant, and is the head of the Bureau of Heraldry, an ex officio member of the Heraldry Council, and a member of the National Archives' directorate. There have been four state/national heralds since the office was established in 1963:

- Coenraad Beyers (1963–1964)
- Norden Hartman (1964–1982)
- Frederick Brownell (1982–2002)
- Themba Mabaso (2002– )

The Bureau has a small staff complement: the National Herald, the Assistant National Herald, a Chief Heraldic Artist, a few artists, an administrative assistant, and a cleaner.

The Bureau has had four homes since its inception. Since 1989 it has been housed in the National Archives building in Pretoria.

Although the State Herald has been called the National Herald since 2004, the Heraldry Act has not yet been amended to reflect this change.

== See also ==
- Heraldry
- Heraldry Council
- South African heraldry
- Canadian Heraldic Authority
- College of Arms (London)
- Court of the Lord Lyon (Scotland)
- Council of Heraldry and Vexillology (Belgium)
- Flemish Heraldic Council
- Office of the Chief Herald of Ireland
