= Paull (disambiguation) =

Paull is a village and civil parish in the East Riding of Yorkshire, England.

Paull may refer to:

== People ==
=== People with the surname ===
- Paull (surname)

=== People with the given name ===
- Paull Shin (1935–2021), Korean–American politician
- Ricky Paull Goldin (born 1968), American actor

== See also ==
- Paul (disambiguation)
- Paulls Valley, Western Australia
- Alfred Paull House, a historic house in Taunton, Massachusetts, U.S.
- Fort Paull, gun battery near the village of Paull
