= Higgins-Hodgeman House =

Historic house in Massachusetts, United States

- U.S. National Register of Historic Places
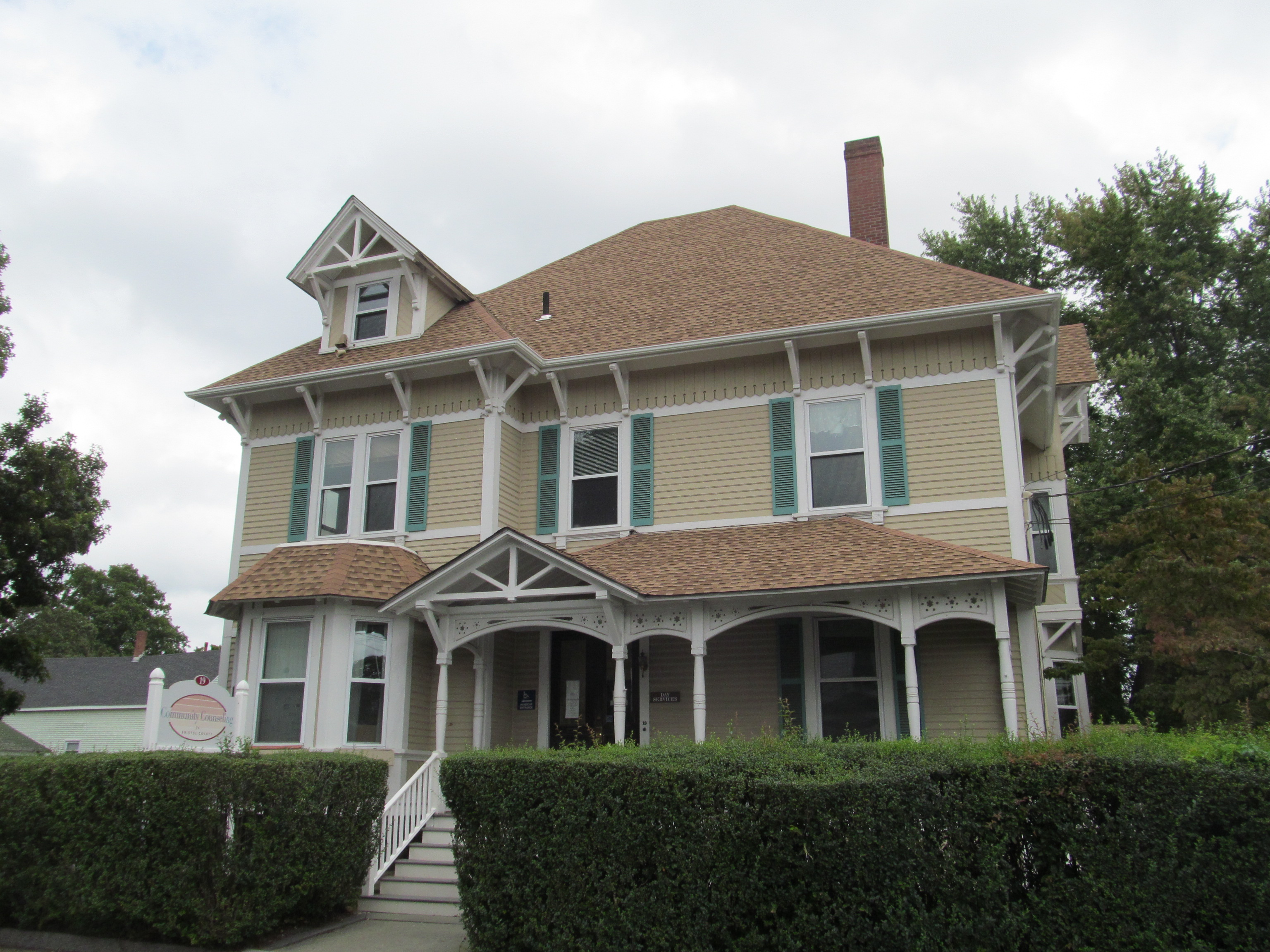
- Higgins-Hodgeman House

- Location within Massachusetts Location within the United States
- Location: 19 Cedar St., Taunton, Massachusetts
- Coordinates: 41°54′15″N 71°5′25″W
- Built: 1880
- Architectural style: Stick/Eastlake
- MPS: Taunton MRA
- NRHP reference No.: 84002128
- Added to NRHP: July 5, 1984

The Higgins-Hodgeman House is a historic house located at 19 Cedar Street in Taunton, Massachusetts.

== Description and history ==
It was built in 1880 for L. B. Higgins, a merchant who operated a dry goods business downtown. The 2 1/2-story frame house is considered one of the best examples of Stick style architecture in the city. It is roughly rectangular, with a hip roof whose cornice is decorated with Stick style brackets. A gabled section projects slightly on the left side of the front facade, with a projecting bay window at the first floor. The right side of the front is taken up by a hip-roof porch, supported by turned posts, and with a decorative valence. It has retained much of its original wood details and clapboard siding.

The house was listed on the National Register of Historic Places on July 5, 1984.

== See also ==
- National Register of Historic Places listings in Taunton, Massachusetts
