= C.J.H. Bassett House =

Historic house in Massachusetts, United States

- U.S. National Register of Historic Places
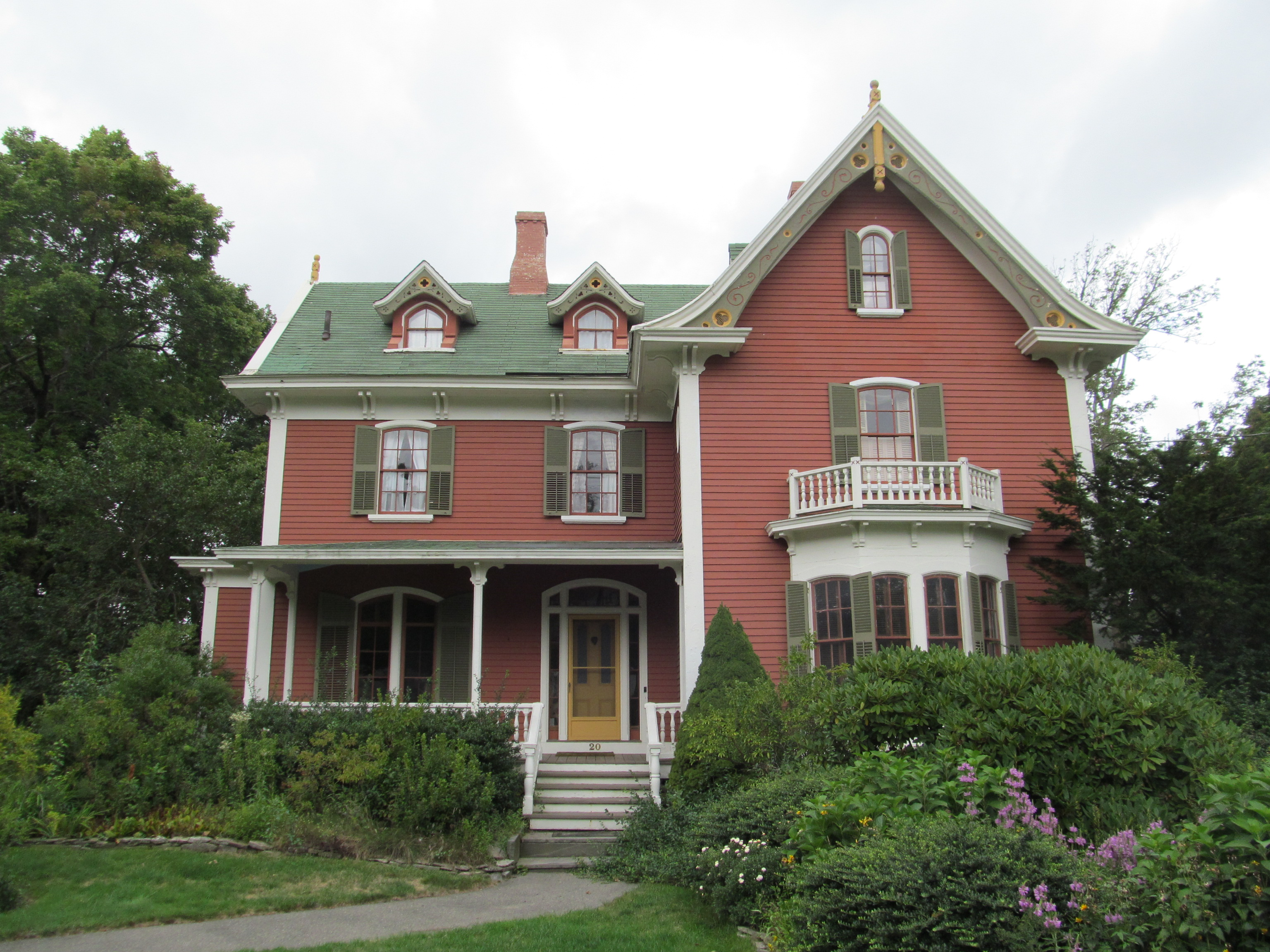

- Location within Massachusetts Location within the United States
- Location: 20 Chestnut St., Taunton, Massachusetts
- Coordinates: 41°54′12″N 71°5′25″W
- Built: 1851
- Architectural style: Gothic Revival
- MPS: Taunton MRA
- NRHP reference No.: 84002091
- Added to NRHP: July 05, 1984

The C.J.H. Bassett House is a historic house located at 20 Chestnut Street in Taunton, Massachusetts. The house was built in 1851 for Charles Jarvis Hunt Bassett, a prominent Taunton attorney and president of the Taunton Bank.

== Description and history ==
The house is locally significant as a rare example of a Gothic Revival residence in the city. The 2 1/2-story frame house features an irregular floor plan and a bell-cast gable roof with Gothic Revival influenced vergeboards, incised and punched with quatrefoil motifs, and pointed arch dormer windows.

It was added to the National Register of Historic Places on July 5, 1984.

== See also ==
- National Register of Historic Places listings in Taunton, Massachusetts
