= Kilmer Street Fire Station =

Historic place in Massachusetts, United States

- U.S. National Register of Historic Places
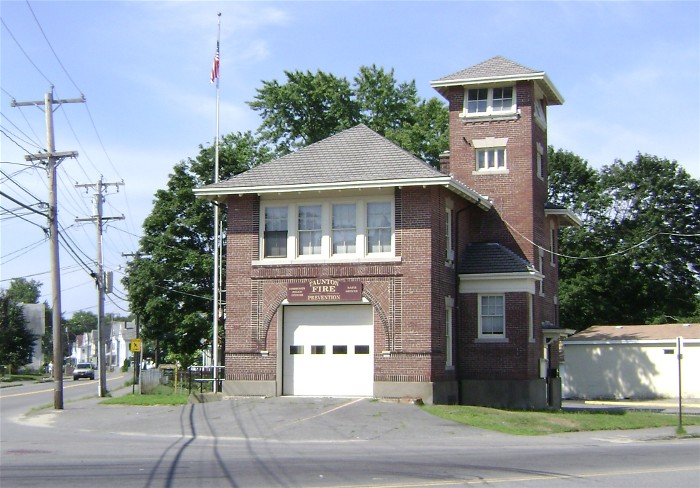

- Location within Massachusetts Location within the United States
- Location: Taunton, Massachusetts
- Coordinates: 41°53′58″N 71°6′25″W
- Built: 1915
- Architectural style: Colonial Revival, Queen Anne
- MPS: Taunton MRA
- NRHP reference No.: 84002138
- Added to NRHP: July 5, 1984

The Kilmer Street Fire Station is a historic former fire station located at the corner of Oak and Kilmer Streets in Taunton, Massachusetts. It was built in 1915 to replace a previous station on Olney Street and is the youngest of the city's five historic fire stations.

The two-story single bay structure features a pyramidal hipped roof and matching hose tower. The original bay door has been replaced to allow for larger vehicles. It was added to the National Register of Historic Places in 1984. The building is currently used by the city for storage.

== See also ==
- National Register of Historic Places listings in Taunton, Massachusetts
