= Taunton Alms House =

Historic house in Massachusetts, United States

- U.S. National Register of Historic Places
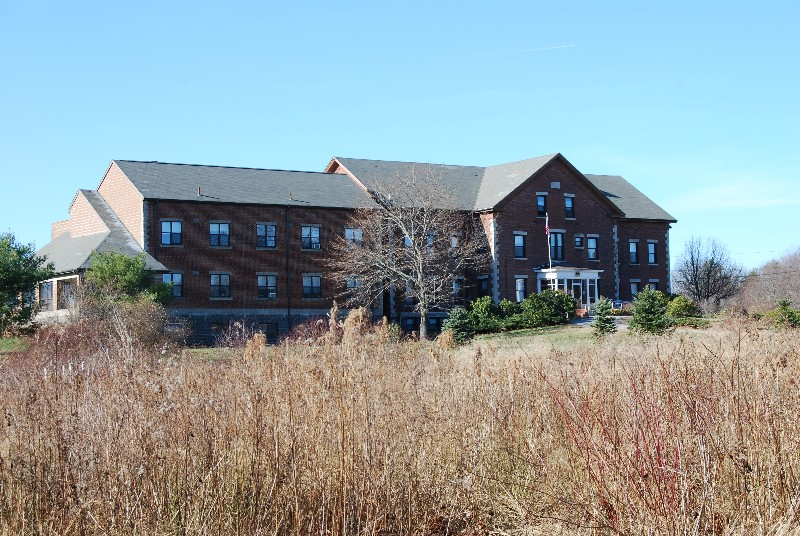

- Location within Massachusetts Location within the United States
- Location: 350 Norton Avenue, Taunton, Massachusetts
- Coordinates: 41°55′7″N 71°7′57″W
- Built: 1876
- Architect: E.C. Chandler
- Architectural style: Italianate
- MPS: Taunton MRA
- NRHP reference No.: 84002223
- Added to NRHP: July 5, 1984

The Taunton Alms House (now the Taunton Nursing Home) is a historic alms house at 350 Norton Avenue in Taunton, Massachusetts. The present facility was built in 1876 as a poorhouse, and was enlarged in the 20th century after its conversion to a nursing home. The building is architecturally a fine example of institutional Italianate architecture, and is an important reminder of progressive social services provided in the late 19th century. The building was added to National Register of Historic Places in 1984.

== Architecture and history ==
The Taunton Nursing Home stands in a suburban residential area of western Taunton, on the south side of Norton Road, between some of the city's schools and athletic fields. The brick building was designed by local architect E.C. Chandler, and has two stories topped by a gable roof and resting on a raised basement. The main facade is nine-bays wide, with a gable-topped projecting section at the center. The building's Italianate styling includes stone corner quoining. Modern ells extend to the left and rear of the original building.

Taunton first established a poor farm on this site in 1826, building a 12-bed facility onto an existing farmhouse. The Panic of 1873 caused an upsurge in demand for poor services, which the city met by building this building in 1876. It was also a period where reformers sought to improve housing, health care and educational conditions for the poor. The property also contained a communal farm. The house had space for sixty indigents, often children, who would stay there until placed with a local family. By 1920, the facility was known as the City Home and Piggery, its operations funded by the raising and sale of pigs. Sometime before 1929, it became more of an infirmary, treating indigent elderly, and in 1980 it underwent a major expansion and conversion into a skilled nursing facility. It is the only municipally owned facility of its type in the state.

== See also ==
- National Register of Historic Places listings in Taunton, Massachusetts
- Fuller-Dauphin Estate, also designed by Chandler
