= Gen. George Godfrey House =

Historic house in Massachusetts, United States

- U.S. National Register of Historic Places
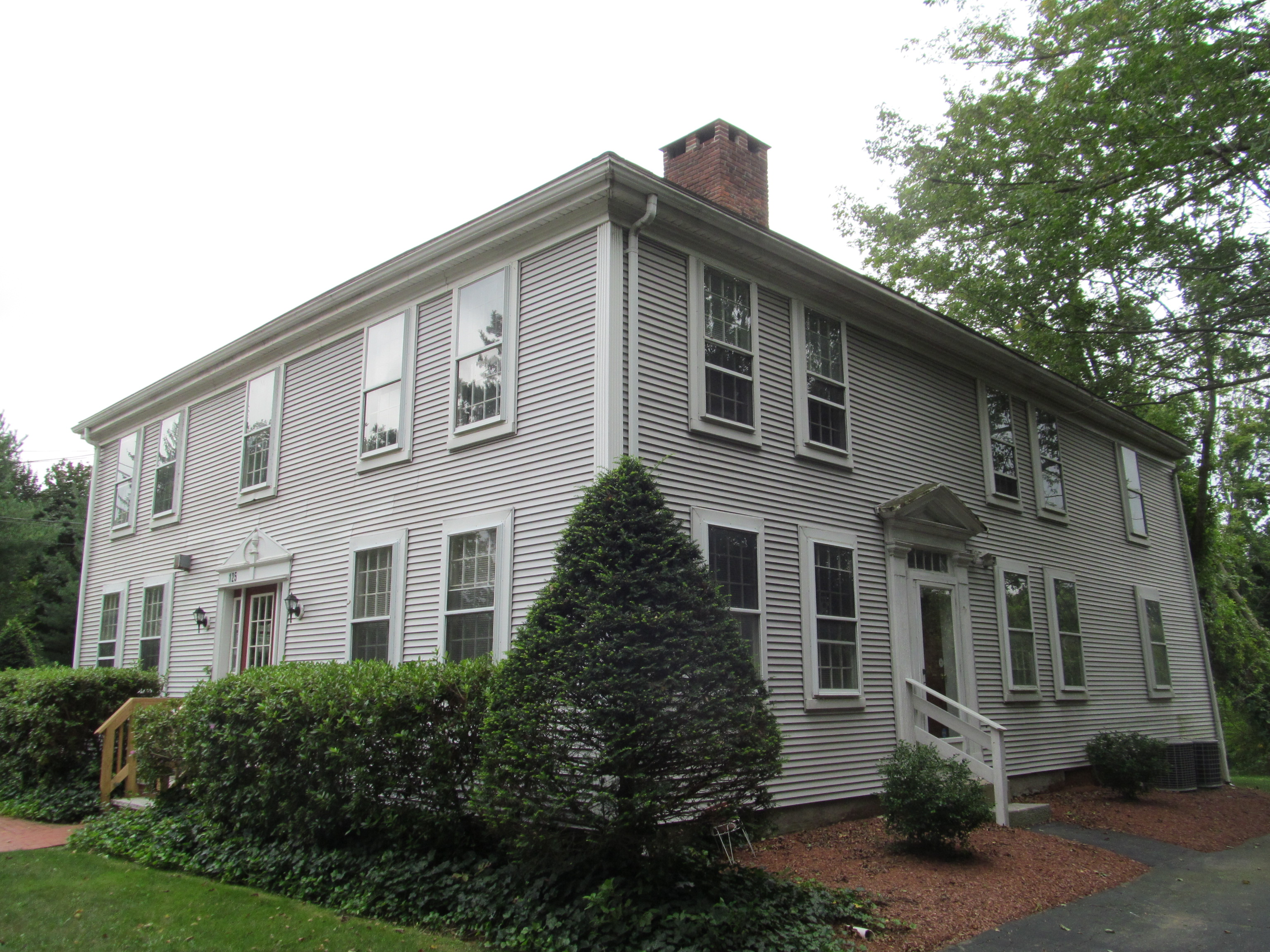
- Gen. George Godfrey House

- Location within Massachusetts Location within the United States
- Location: 125 County St., Taunton, Massachusetts
- Coordinates: 41°53′46″N 71°4′43″W
- Built: 1780
- Architectural style: Federal
- MPS: Taunton MRA
- NRHP reference No.: 84002119
- Added to NRHP: July 5, 1984

The Gen. George Godfrey House is a historic colonial American house located at 125 County Street in Taunton, Massachusetts.

== Description and history ==
The Federal style house was built in 1780 for George Godfrey, who served as a brigadier general during the Revolutionary War.

At that time, the house was one of three documented houses of the Georgian and Federal periods in Taunton that exhibited true double-pile plans and early stylistic details. However, the house has since been covered with vinyl siding and much of its original wood trim has been lost. It is currently occupied by Nightingale Visiting Nurses.

It was added to the National Register of Historic Places on July 5, 1984.

== See also ==
- National Register of Historic Places listings in Taunton, Massachusetts
