= N. S. Mason House =

Historic house in Massachusetts, United States

- U.S. National Register of Historic Places
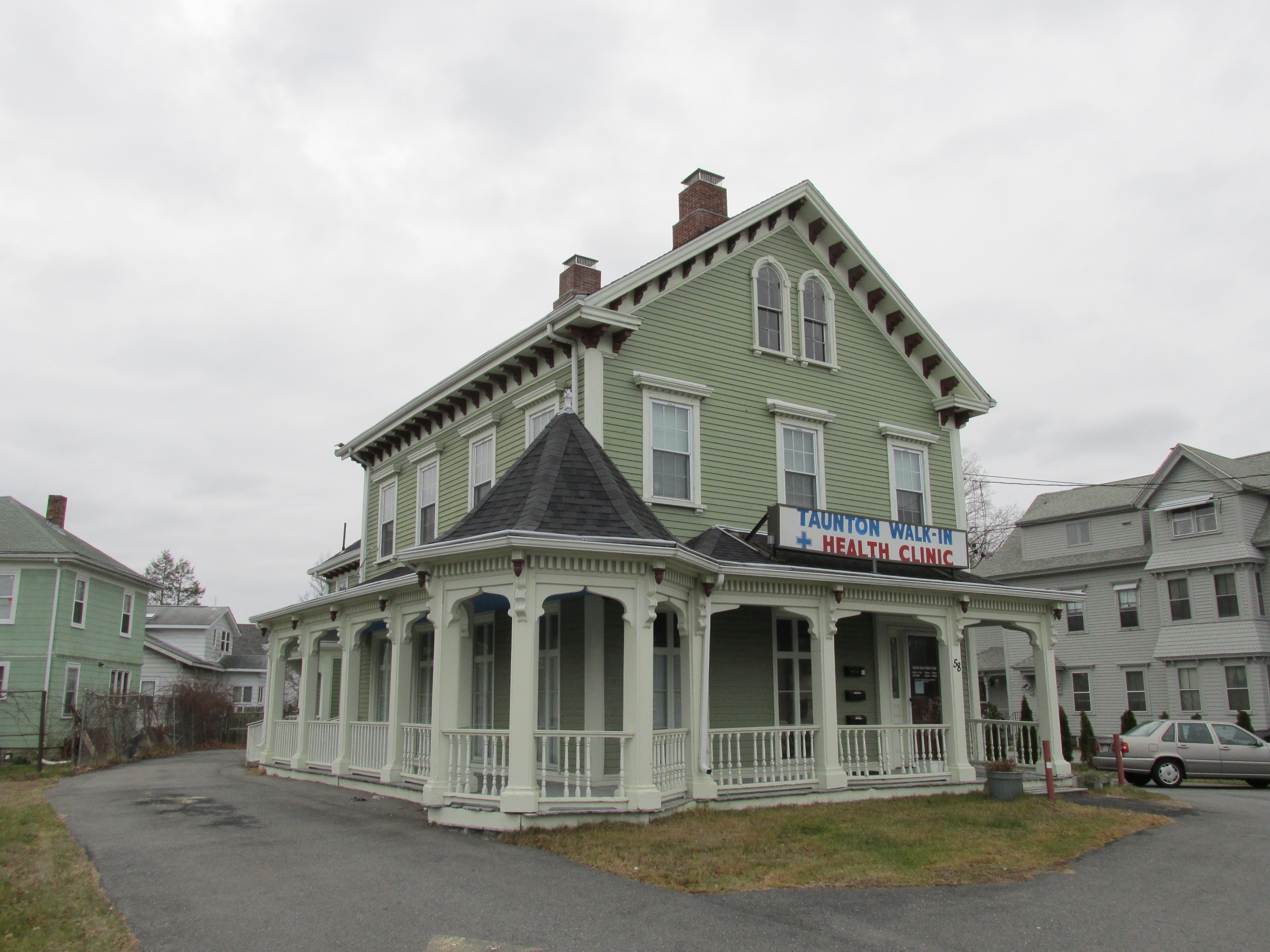
- 58 Tremont Street

- Location within Massachusetts Location within the United States
- Location: Taunton, Massachusetts
- Coordinates: 41°54′18″N 71°6′24″W
- Built: 1865
- Architectural style: Italianate
- MPS: Taunton MRA
- NRHP reference No.: 84002178
- Added to NRHP: July 5, 1984

The N. S. Mason House is a historic house at 58 Tremont Street in Taunton, Massachusetts. Built in 1865, the 2 1/2-story Italianate-style side-hall-plan house features decorative porch and window moldings and bracketed gables and eaves. A large wraparound porch is highlighted by a corner cupola. Its main entrance is flanked by sidelight windows and framed by a molded surround.

The house was added to the National Register of Historic Places in 1984. It is now occupied by a medical clinic.

== See also ==
- National Register of Historic Places listings in Taunton, Massachusetts
