= Enoch Williams House =

Historic house in Massachusetts, United States

- U.S. National Register of Historic Places
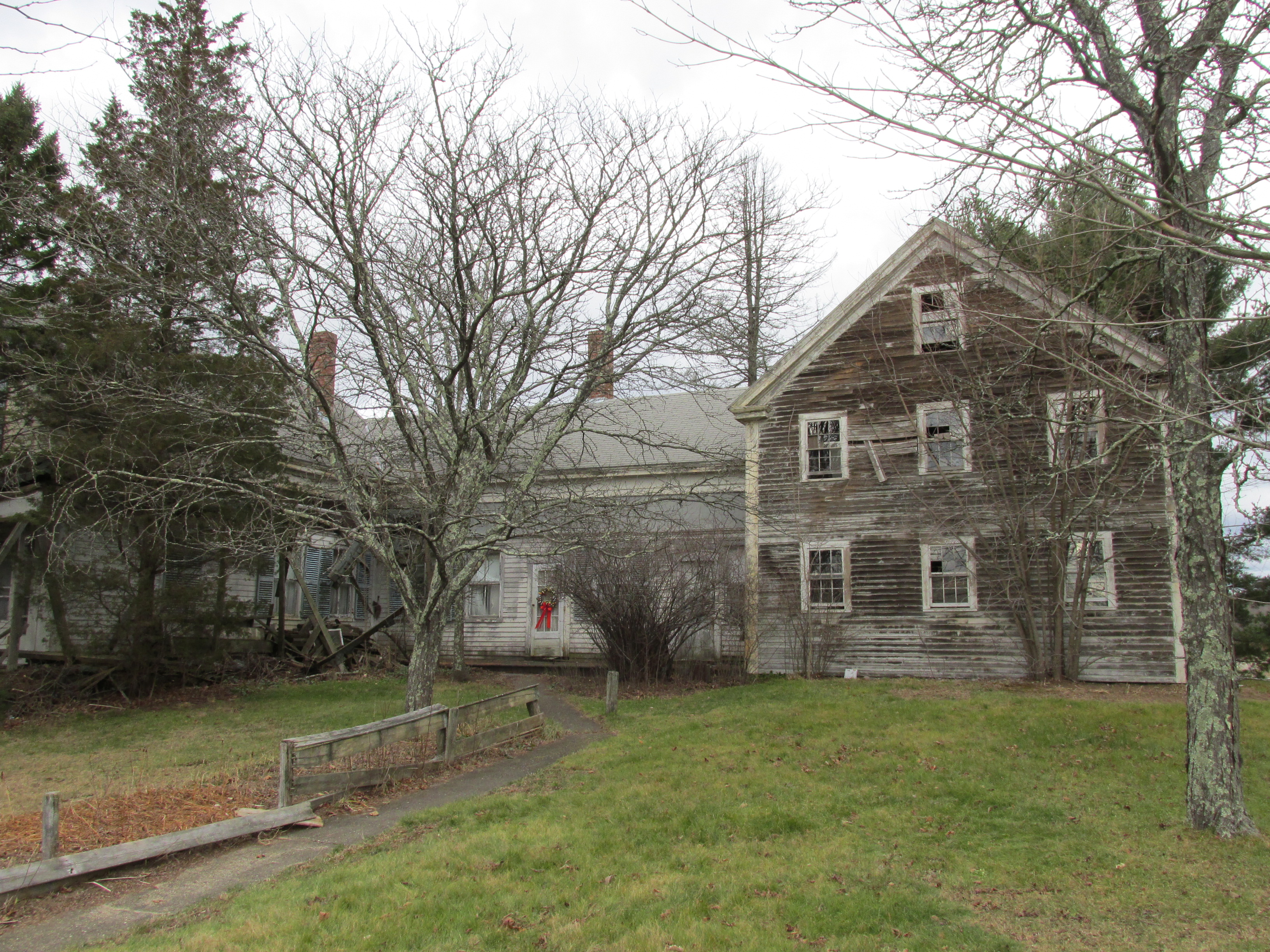
- Enoch Williams House

- Location within Massachusetts Location within the United States
- Location: 616 Middleboro Ave., Taunton, Massachusetts
- Coordinates: 41°52′57″N 71°1′26″W
- Built: 1850
- Architectural style: Greek Revival
- MPS: Taunton MRA
- NRHP reference No.: 84002280
- Added to NRHP: July 5, 1984

The Enoch Williams House is a historic house located in Taunton, Massachusetts.

== Description and history ==
Built in 1850, the 1 1/2-story, Greek Revival style farm house is set on a side hall plan, with a front gable with a recessed wing and attached barn. The entrance features side lights with a pilaster and entablature surround. The house was built by Enoch Williams, member of a prominent East Taunton family, and is located on what is one of East Taunton's largest surviving farm properties.

It was added to the National Register of Historic Places on July 5, 1984.

== See also ==
- National Register of Historic Places listings in Taunton, Massachusetts
