= Abiezar Dean House =

Historic house in Massachusetts, United States

- U.S. National Register of Historic Places
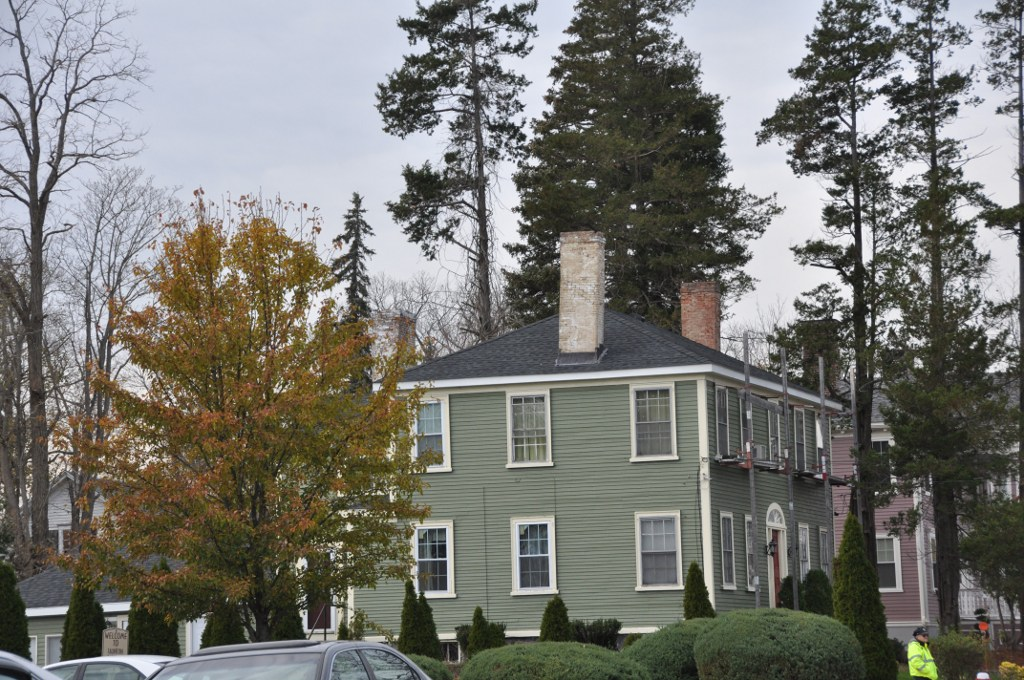

- Location within Massachusetts Location within the United States
- Location: 57 Summer St., Taunton, Massachusetts
- Coordinates: 41°54′0″N 71°5′17″W
- Built: 1835
- Architectural style: Federal
- MPS: Taunton MRA
- NRHP reference No.: 84002104
- Added to NRHP: July 5, 1984

The Abiezar Dean House is a historic house located at 57 Summer Street in Taunton, Massachusetts.

== Description and history ==
The late Federal Period house was built in 1835, and is a two-story, wood-framed house, five bays wide, with a hipped roof, clapboard siding, and interior end chimneys. Its central entrance is trimmed by a semi-elliptical fanlight and narrow sidelights. The Dean family, for whom it was built, is a locally prominent family of early settlers to the area.

It was added to the National Register of Historic Places on July 5, 1984

== See also ==
- National Register of Historic Places listings in Taunton, Massachusetts
