= Theodore L. Marvel House =

Historic house in Massachusetts, United States

- U.S. National Register of Historic Places
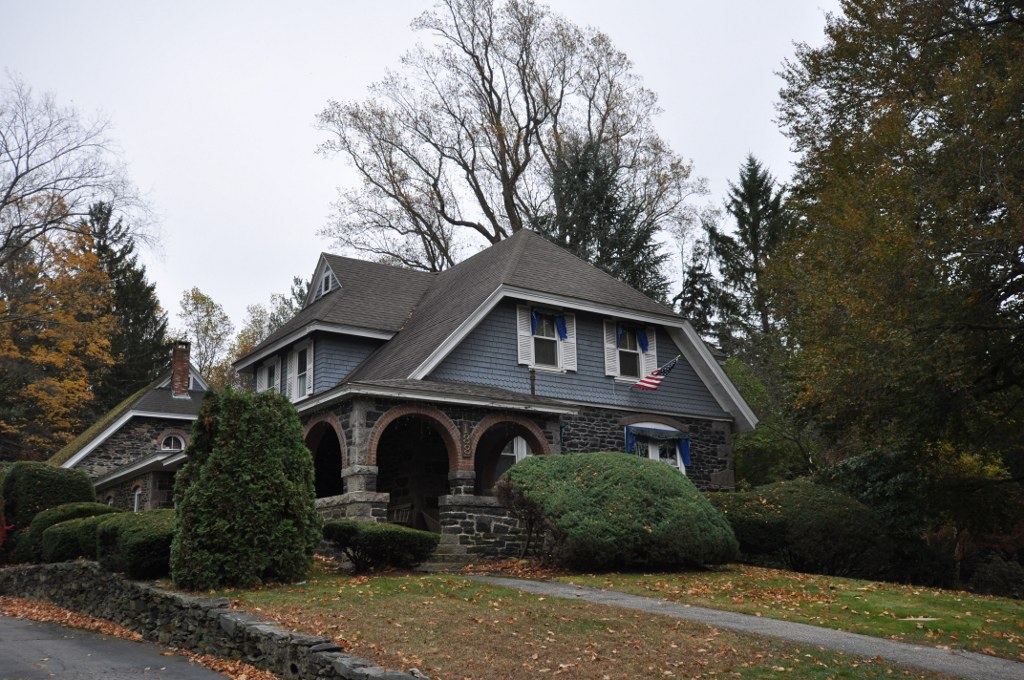

- Location within Massachusetts Location within the United States
- Location: Taunton, Massachusetts
- Coordinates: 41°52′46″N 71°5′23″W
- Built: 1883
- Architectural style: Shingle Style
- MPS: Taunton MRA
- NRHP reference No.: 84002176
- Added to NRHP: July 5, 1984

The Theodore L. Marvel House is a historic house located at 188 Berkley Street in Taunton, Massachusetts. It was built in 1883 in a shingle style and was added to the National Register of Historic Places in 1984.

The irregularly-shaped house features a hipped gable roof and varied wall surface of fieldstone and shingles. Among its most dominant elements are its boldly-arched fieldstone porch, varied fenestration, and connected Shingle Style barn, with sweeping roof, eyebrow windows and large arched entrance, constructed of fieldstone. It is sited on a large landscaped estate.

== See also ==
- National Register of Historic Places listings in Taunton, Massachusetts
