= Hopewell Mills District =

Historic district in Massachusetts, United States

- U.S. National Register of Historic Places
- U.S. Historic district
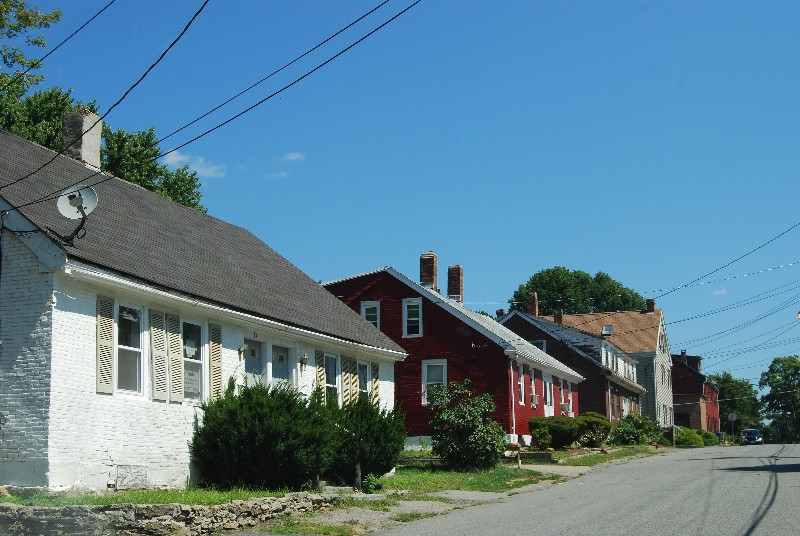
- Albro Avenue

- Location within Massachusetts Location within the United States
- Location: Taunton, Massachusetts
- Coordinates: 41°54′57″N 71°5′42″W
- Built: 1818
- Architectural style: Greek Revival
- MPS: Taunton MRA
- NRHP reference No.: 84002133
- Added to NRHP: July 5, 1984

The Hopewell Mills District is a historic district on Bay Street and Albro Avenue in Taunton, Massachusetts. The site is associated with the Hopewell Mills, one of the earliest textile mills in the city, established in 1818 (mill now demolished).

The historic district contains a number of early 19th century brick mill worker tenement homes and was added to the National Register of Historic Places in 1984.

== History ==
The village was established in 1818 by a group of industrialists led by Charles Richmond, in association with Samuel Crocker and Silas Shepard. The site previously contained a nail-cutting mill owned by Samuel Leonard, built in the 1780s. Crocker and Richmond first built a cotton mill, one hundred feet in length. The basement included a machine shop and nail factory. A second cotton mill was added in 1821. In 1823, the mills were merged into the stock of the Taunton Manufacturing Company, which operated the mills until 1843.

After the bankruptcy of Taunton Manufacturing Company, the mills were acquired by Cyrus Lothrop who controlled the site until his accidental death in 1854. The property then passed to Charles Albro, who had been superintendent of the mills. Much of the village that exists today dates from the period of Albro's ownership (1854-1888). In 1888, Albro sold the mill to the investment firm of L. Beebe & Co. of Boston, who operated it until 1904, when the mill was destroyed by fire. The ruins remained in place for many years.

== See also ==
- National Register of Historic Places listings in Taunton, Massachusetts
