= Richard Godfrey House =

Historic house in Massachusetts, United States

- U.S. National Register of Historic Places
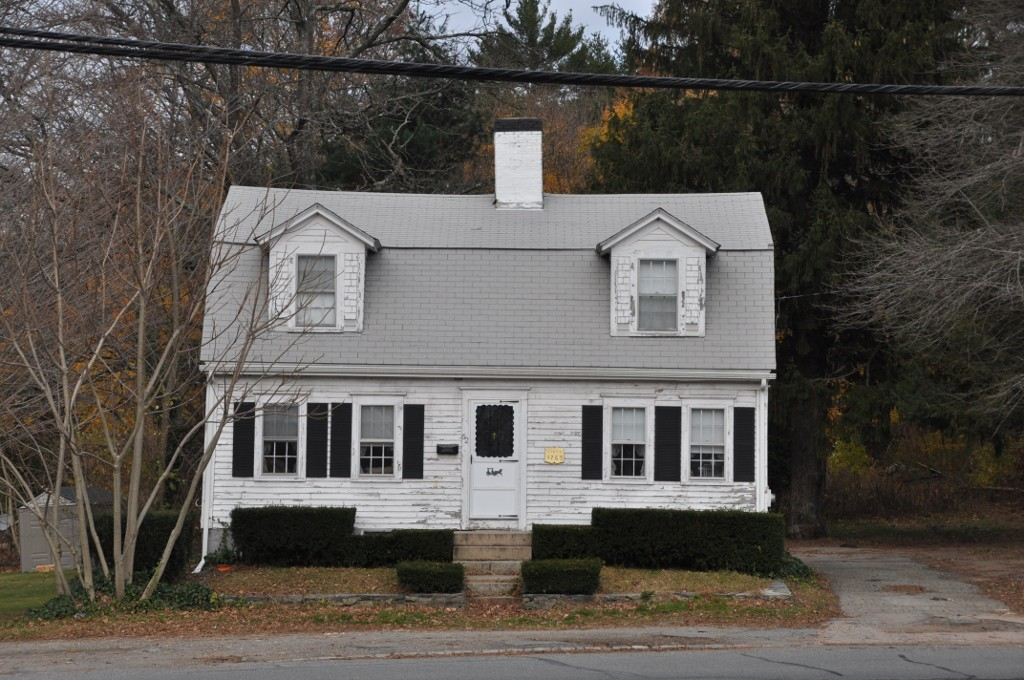

- Location within Massachusetts Location within the United States
- Location: 62 County St., Taunton, Massachusetts
- Coordinates: 41°53′49″N 71°4′51″W
- Built: c. 1750
- Architectural style: Colonial
- MPS: Taunton MRA
- NRHP reference No.: 84002121
- Added to NRHP: July 5, 1984

The Richard Godfrey House is a historic house located at 62 County Street in Taunton, Massachusetts.

== Description and history ==
It is a 1 1/2-story, wood-framed structure, with a side-gable gambrel roof (with two gable-roofed dormers), a central chimney, and clapboard siding. The main facade is five bays wide, symmetrically arranged, with a center entrance that has simple trim. It was built in about 1750 in the "Neck-o-Land" section of the town, near the Mill River where early industries developed. It is a rare surviving early gambrel-roofed structure within the city.

The house was listed on the National Register of Historic Places on July 5, 1984.

== See also ==
- National Register of Historic Places listings in Taunton, Massachusetts
