= Peter Walker House =

Historic house in Massachusetts, United States

- U.S. National Register of Historic Places
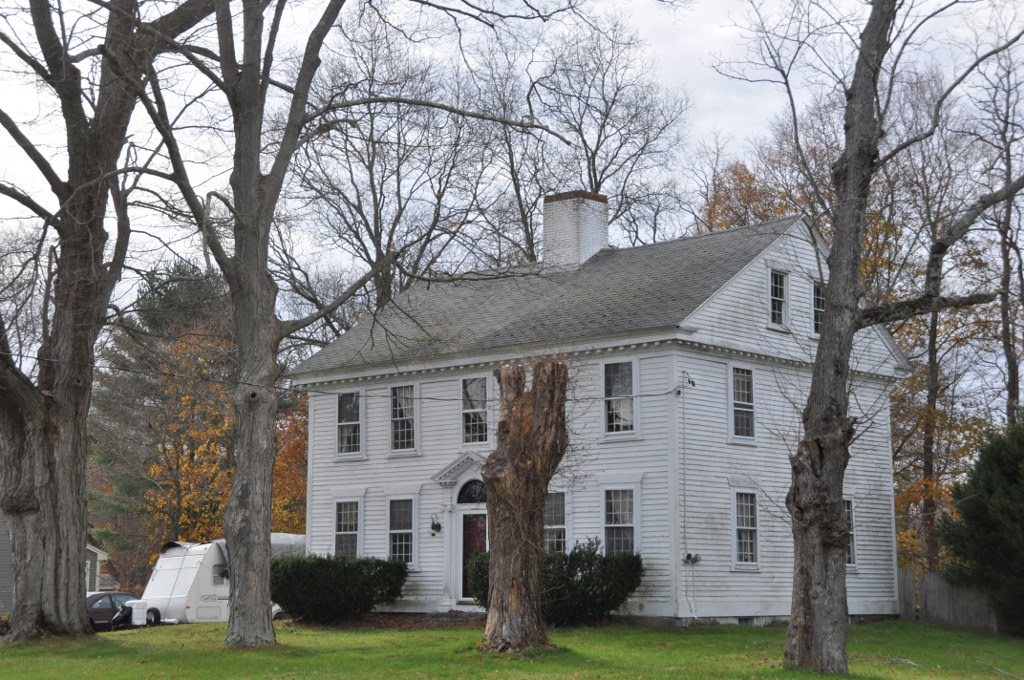

- Location within Massachusetts Location within the United States
- Location: 1679 Somerset Ave., Taunton, Massachusetts
- Coordinates: 41°51′26″N 71°6′55″W
- Built: c. 1727
- Architectural style: Georgian
- MPS: Taunton MRA
- NRHP reference No.: 84002256
- Added to NRHP: July 5, 1984

The Peter Walker House is a historic colonial house located at 1679 Somerset Avenue in Taunton, Massachusetts.

== Description and history ==
Built in about 1727, this 2 1/2-story, Georgian style, wood-framed house is the oldest documented house in the city. It is five bays wide and two bays deep, with a side-gable roof and a large central chimney. Its main entry is framed by pilasters, and topped by a fanlight and gabled pediment. Peter Walker purchased the land, and is said to have built the house soon afterward as a wedding present for his new bride.

The house was listed on the National Register of Historic Places on July 5, 1984.

== See also ==
- National Register of Historic Places listings in Taunton, Massachusetts
