= Asa Lincoln House =

Historic house in Massachusetts, United States

- U.S. National Register of Historic Places
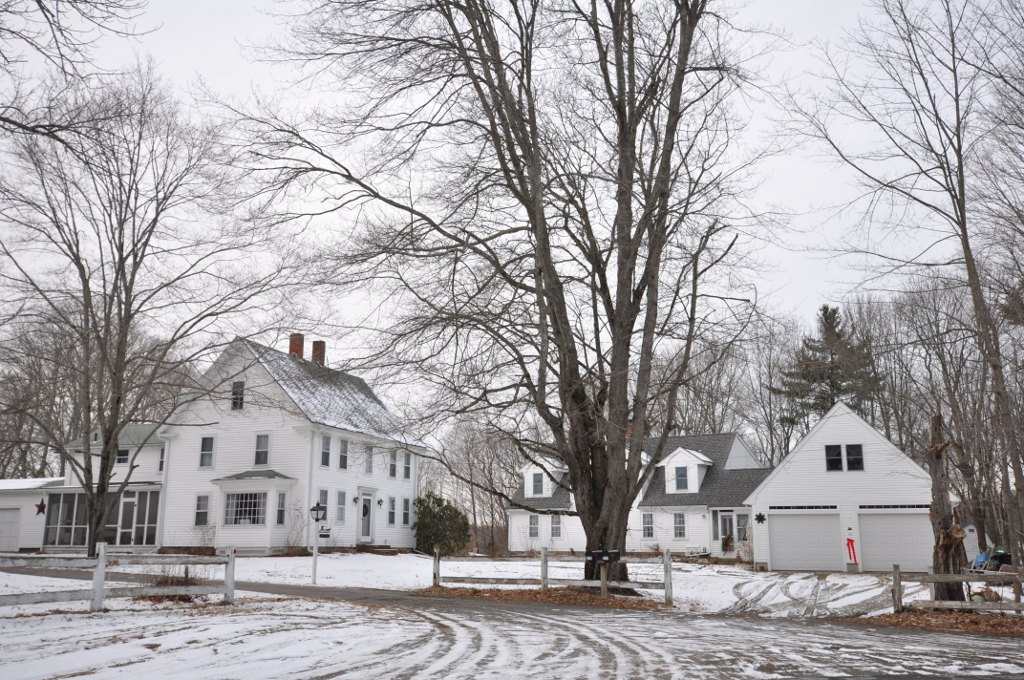
- 171 Shores Street (at center)

- Location within Massachusetts Location within the United States
- Location: 171 Shores St., Taunton, Massachusetts
- Coordinates: 41°54′3″N 71°7′29″W
- Built: c. 1760
- Architectural style: Georgian
- MPS: Taunton MRA
- NRHP reference No.: 84002159
- Added to NRHP: July 5, 1984

The Asa Lincoln House is a historic house located at 171 Shores Street in Taunton, Massachusetts.

== Description and history ==
The simple vernacular house was built in about 1760, and is locally significant for its status as the original homestead of Asa Lincoln, one of Taunton's first settlers. The asymmetrically bayed, 1 1/2-story house features a central chimney, entrance and 6/6 sash windows that are irregularly spaced. The small house is next door to a newer, larger (non-NRHP listed) 18th century house located 173 Shores Street, that has been added on to.

It was added to the National Register of Historic Places on July 5, 1984. Since that time, the historic house has been significantly altered with three large dormers added to the upper level. A new garage has also been constructed on the property.

== See also ==
- National Register of Historic Places listings in Taunton, Massachusetts
