= H. B. Lothrop Store =

- U.S. National Register of Historic Places
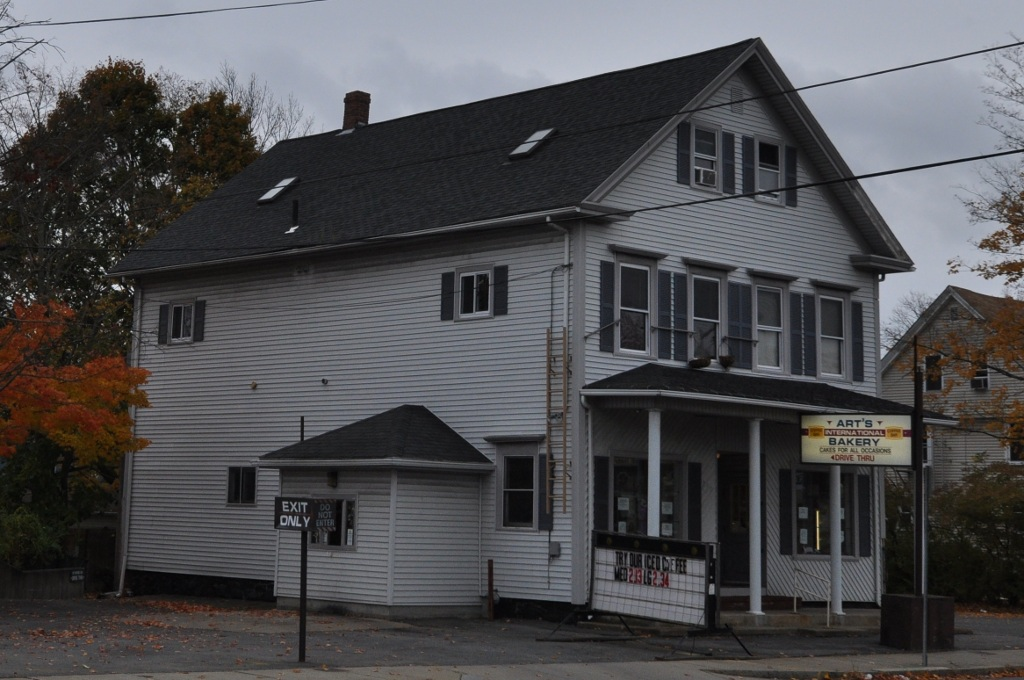

- Location within Massachusetts Location within the United States
- Location: Taunton, Massachusetts
- Coordinates: 41°53′46″N 71°6′14″W
- Built: 1855
- Architectural style: Italianate
- MPS: Taunton MRA
- NRHP reference No.: 84002166
- Added to NRHP: July 5, 1984

The H. B. Lothrop Store is a historic commercial building located at 210 Weir Street in Taunton, Massachusetts. The Italianate style building was constructed in 1855 by H. B. Lothrop who operated a grocery store here into the 1880s.

It was added to the National Register of Historic Places in 1984. However, since that time the original clapboard siding has been covered with vinyl siding, and much of the original wood detailing has been lost. The original decorative front canopy has also been replaced.

For a time the building was occupied by Art's International Bakery.

== See also ==
- National Register of Historic Places listings in Taunton, Massachusetts
