= Charles R. Atwood House =

Historic house in Massachusetts, United States

- U.S. National Register of Historic Places
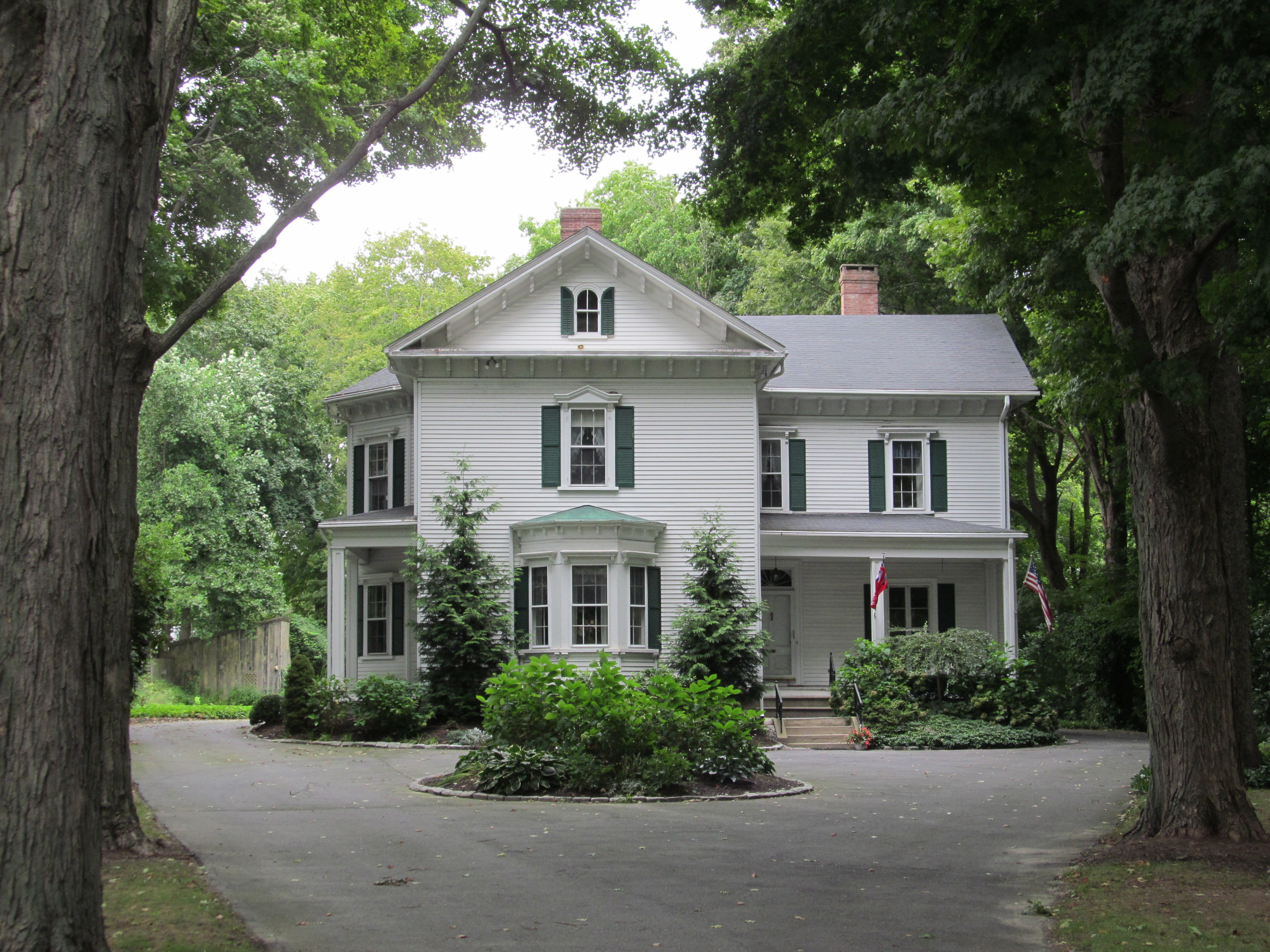

- Location within Massachusetts Location within the United States
- Location: 30 Dean Street, Taunton, Massachusetts
- Coordinates: 41°54′14″N 71°4′59″W
- Built: c. 1850
- Architectural style: Italianate
- MPS: Taunton MRA
- NRHP reference No.: 84002087
- Added to NRHP: July 5, 1984

The Charles R. Atwood House is a historic house located at 30 Dean Street in Taunton, Massachusetts.

== Description and history ==
The Italianate style single family house was built in about 1850 for Charles R. Atwood, treasurer and agent for the Phoenix Manufacturing Co. The house remained in the Atwood family until the 1930s. It is a 2 1/2-story L-shaped, wood-framed structure, with the entry porch at the crook of the L, and a second porch against the left side. The eaves are bracketed, and windows are capped by bracketed lintels. The exterior of the house has clapboard siding.

The house was added to the National Register of Historic Places on July 5, 1984.

== See also ==
- National Register of Historic Places listings in Taunton, Massachusetts
