= Sylvanus N. Staples House =

Historic house in Massachusetts, United States

- U.S. National Register of Historic Places
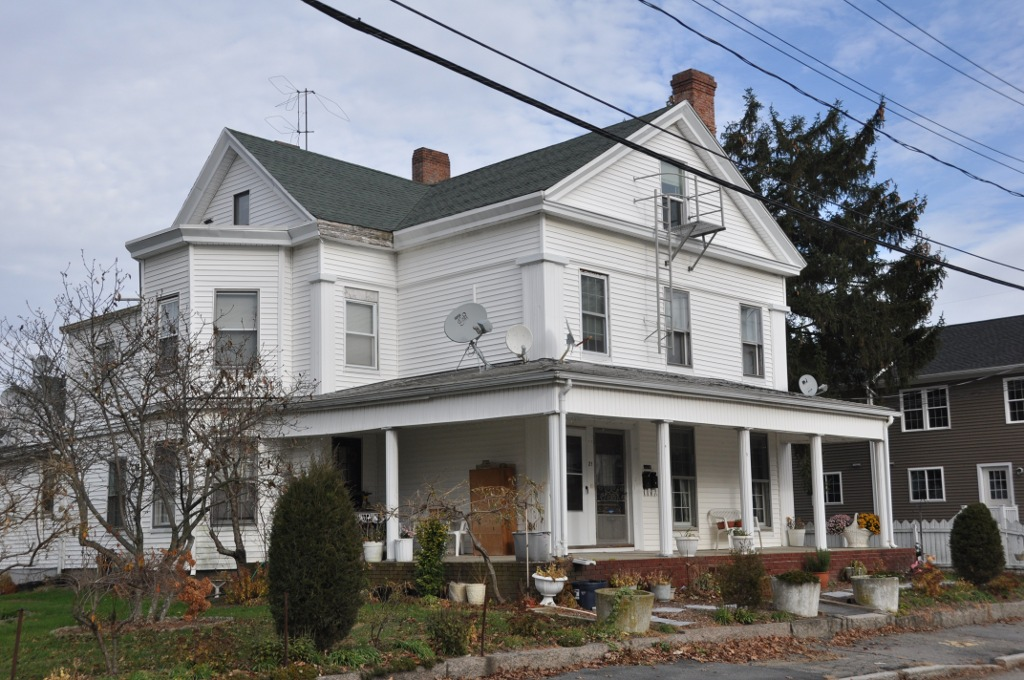

- Location within Massachusetts Location within the United States
- Location: 21 Second St., Taunton, Massachusetts
- Coordinates: 41°53′11″N 71°5′37″W
- Built: 1837
- Architectural style: Greek Revival
- MPS: Taunton MRA
- NRHP reference No.: 84002217
- Added to NRHP: July 5, 1984

The Sylvanus N. Staples House is a historic house located at 21 Second Street in Taunton, Massachusetts.

== Description and history ==
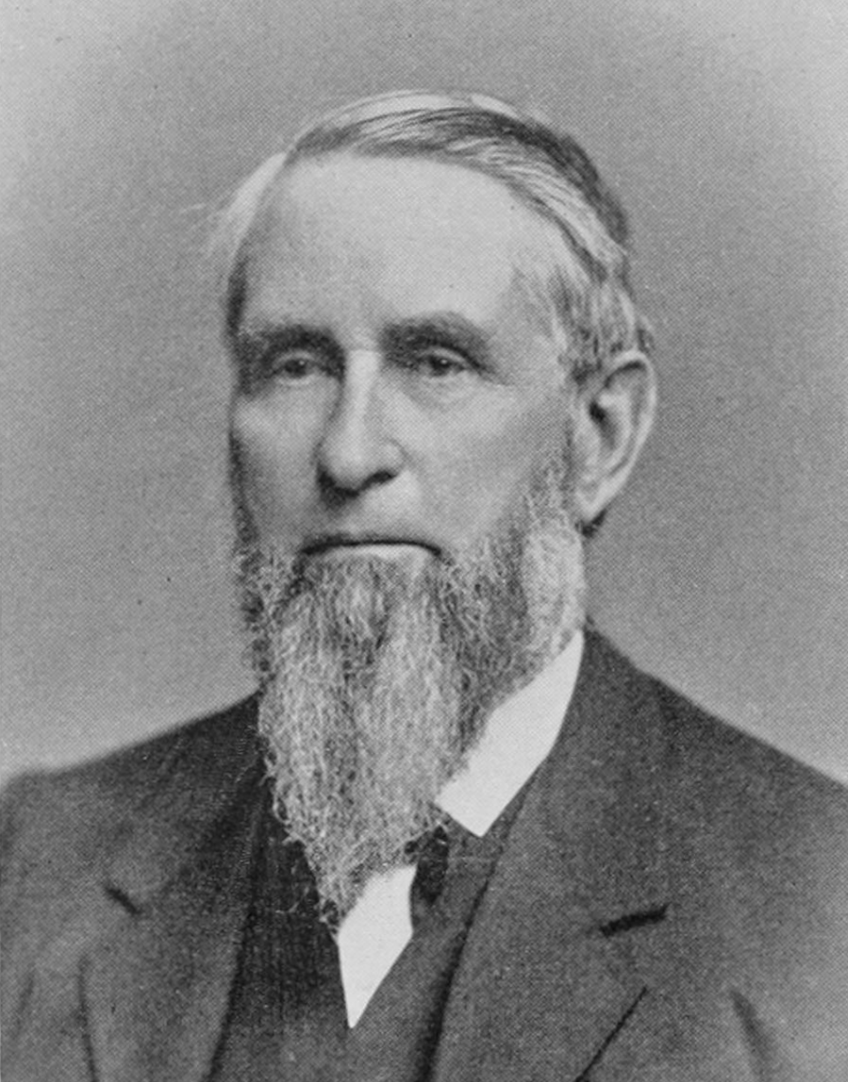
Sylvanus N. Staples

The Greek Revival style, 2 1/2-story, wood-framed house was built in 1837 by Sylvanus Staples, a leading merchant of the Weir Village area of Taunton. Staples (1811-1893) went to sea as a young man, and was by the 1830s a successful merchant, dealing in flour and groceries. He greatly expanded is business during the 19th century, and died in this house in 1893.

The house was listed on the National Register of Historic Places on July 5, 1984.

== See also ==
- National Register of Historic Places listings in Taunton, Massachusetts
