= Barnum School =

- U.S. National Register of Historic Places
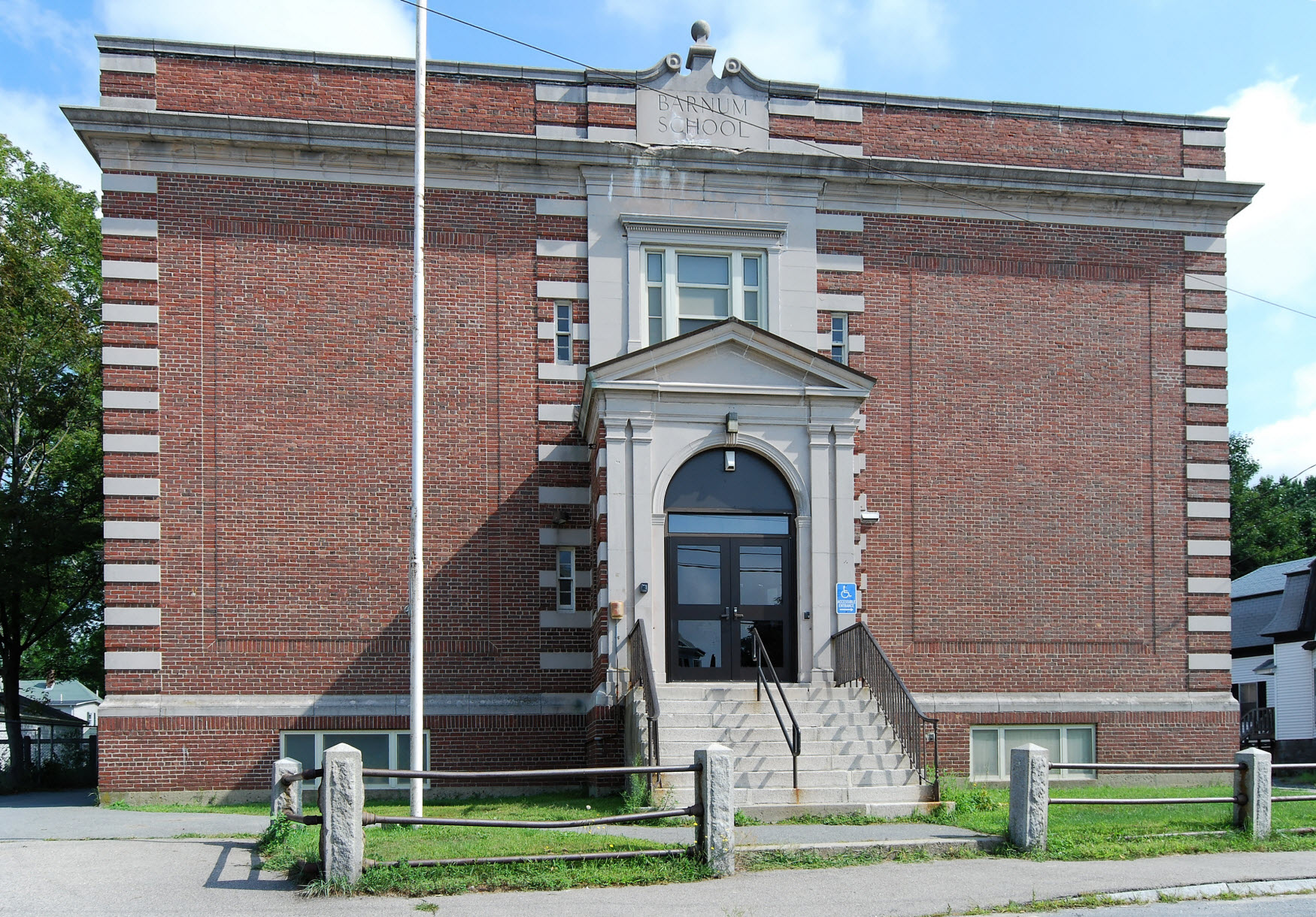

- Location within Massachusetts Location within the United States
- Location: Taunton, Massachusetts
- Coordinates: 41°53′40″N 71°5′45″W
- Built: 1926
- Architect: Briggs, George W.
- Architectural style: Colonial Revival, Other
- MPS: Taunton MRA
- NRHP reference No.: 84002088
- Added to NRHP: July 5, 1984

The Barnum School is a historic elementary school located on Barnum Street in Taunton, Massachusetts. It was designed by architect George W. Briggs and built in 1926 to replace a previous school on the site that had burned. When it opened, the Barnum School was considered the most modern in school design in an era of continuing educational reform. It is a two-story brick structure with Colonial Revival styling. The front facade has three sections, with two bays of brick paneling (apparently filling locations where there may have originally been windows) flanking the main entrance, which is set in a round-arch opening in a projecting gable-topped vestibule. It was added to the National Register of Historic Places in 1984.

The school closed in June 2013.

== See also ==
- National Register of Historic Places listings in Taunton, Massachusetts
