= H. P. Thomas House =

Historic house in Massachusetts, United States

- U.S. National Register of Historic Places
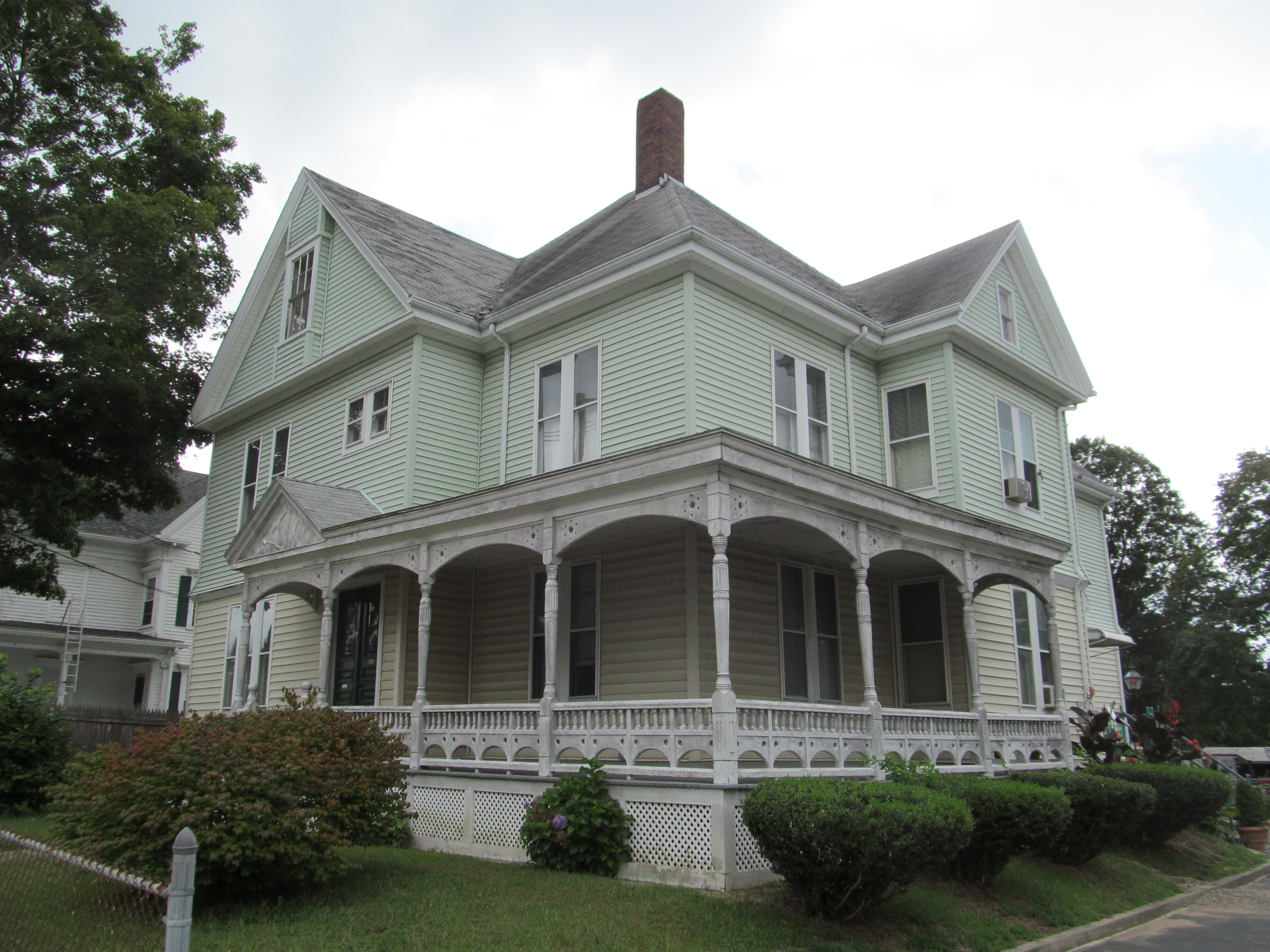

- Location within Massachusetts Location within the United States
- Location: 322 Somerset Ave., Taunton, Massachusetts
- Coordinates: 41°53′16″N 71°5′39″W
- Built: c. 1887
- Architectural style: Queen Anne
- MPS: Taunton MRA
- NRHP reference No.: 84002228
- Added to NRHP: July 5, 1984

The H. P. Thomas House is an historic house located at 322 Somerset Avenue in Taunton, Massachusetts.

== Description and history ==
The 2 1/2-story, wood-framed house was built in about 1887, and is a fine local example of Queen Anne styling. The house has asymmetrical massing, with large gable-roof sections projecting from an otherwise hipped roof. The porch has fine decorative balustrades and valances, as well as delicate turned posts. The gable ends were at one time decorated with almost Tudoresque applied Stick style woodwork, but these have apparently been sided over or removed.

The house was listed on the National Register of Historic Places on July 5, 1984.

== See also ==
- National Register of Historic Places listings in Taunton, Massachusetts
