= George Capron House =

House in Massachusetts, U.S.A

- U.S. National Register of Historic Places
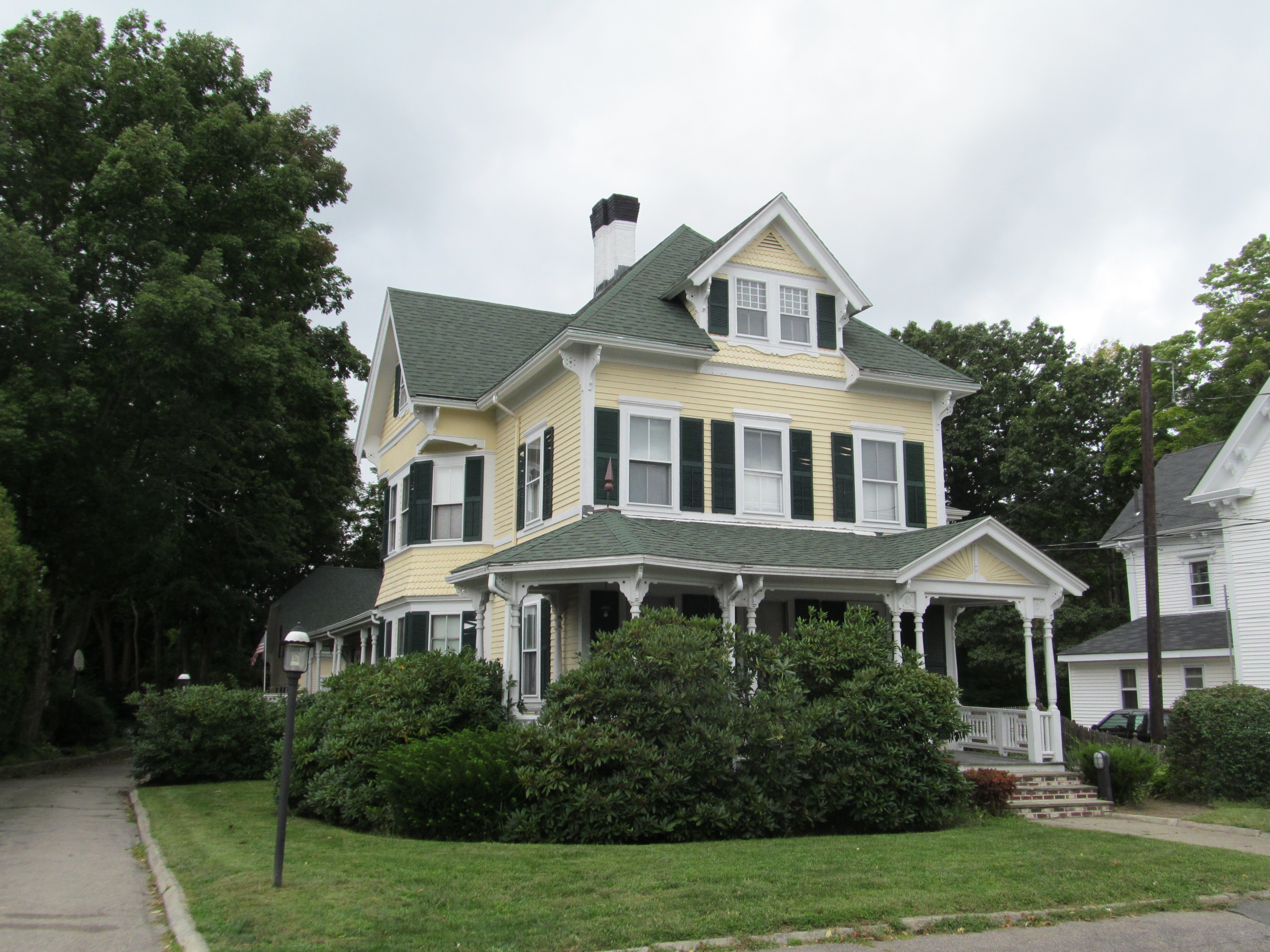
- George Capron House, September 2012

- Location within Massachusetts Location within the United States
- Location: 6 N. Pleasant St., Taunton, Massachusetts
- Coordinates: 41°54′24″N 71°5′52″W
- Built: 1888
- Architectural style: Queen Anne
- MPS: Taunton MRA
- NRHP reference No.: 84002099
- Added to NRHP: July 5, 1984

The George Capron House is a historic house located at 6 North Pleasant Street in Taunton, Massachusetts.

== Description and history ==
Constructed in 1888, the house is considered a fine example of a "builders Queen Anne" style house built for middle class residents during the late 19th century. The 2 1/2-story house has asymmetrical massing typical of the style, with projecting gabled sections and a decorative wraparound porch. The property includes a matching carriage house.

It was added to the National Register of Historic Places on July 5, 1984.

== See also ==
- National Register of Historic Places listings in Taunton, Massachusetts
