= Dean-Hartshorn House =

Historic house in Massachusetts, United States

- U.S. National Register of Historic Places
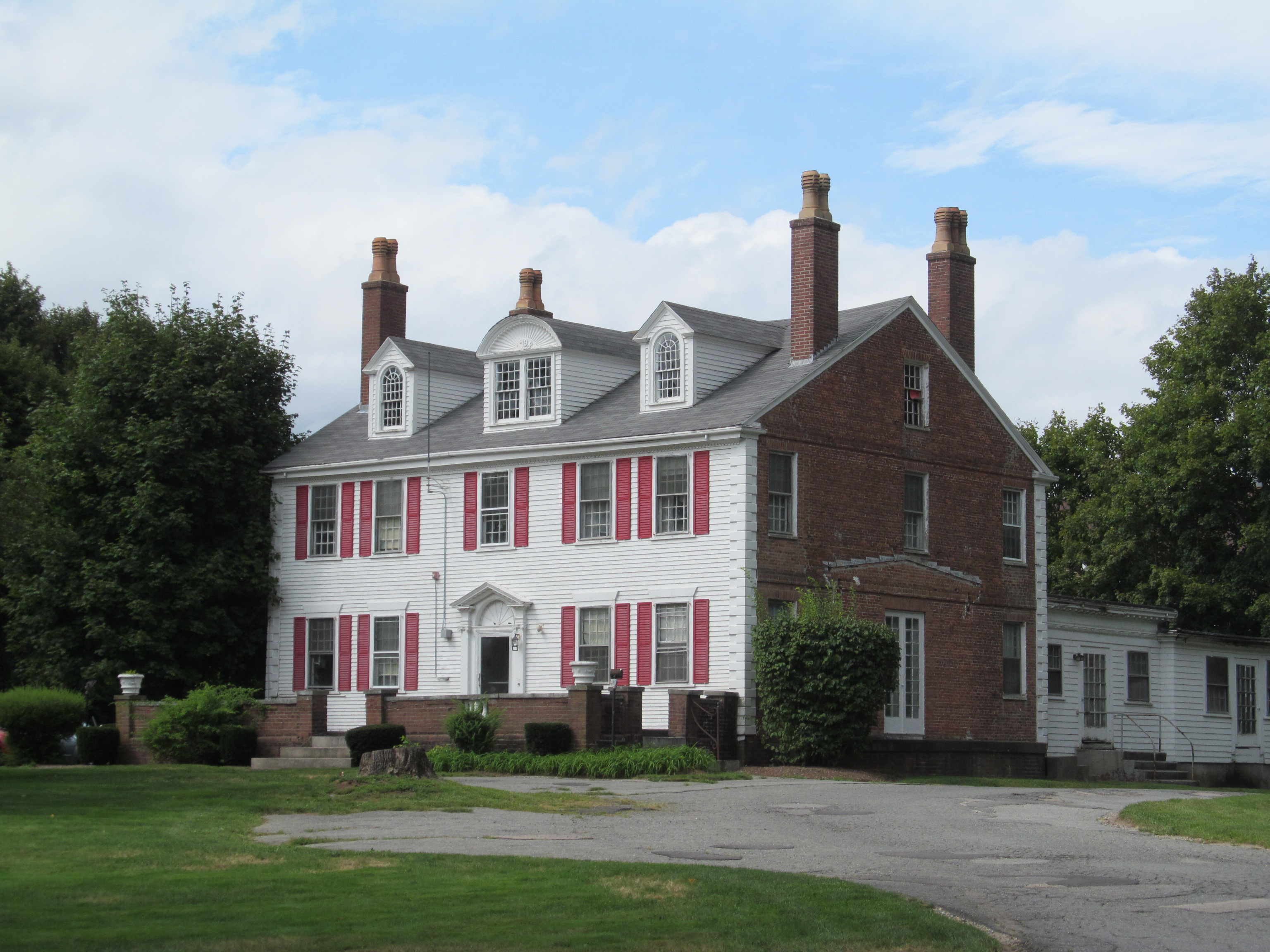
- Dean-Hartshorn House

- Location within Massachusetts Location within the United States
- Location: 68 Dean St., Taunton, Massachusetts
- Coordinates: 41°54′14″N 71°4′52″W
- Built: c. 1798
- Architectural style: Georgian
- MPS: Taunton MRA
- NRHP reference No.: 84002111
- Added to NRHP: July 5, 1984

The Dean-Hartshorn House is a historic house located at 68 Dean Street in Taunton, Massachusetts.

== Description and history ==
It was built in about 1798 for Abiezar Dean. The 2 1/2-story structure features brick ends, four symmetrically placed chimneys, and a classically detailed front entrance.

In 1905, the house was purchased by George Hartshorn, who added the east and west wings and dormers. In 1915 the east wing was removed and relocated to nearby Longmeadow Road and converted into a residence.

It was added to the National Register of Historic Places on July 5, 1984. It currently functions as a nursing home.

== See also ==
- National Register of Historic Places listings in Taunton, Massachusetts
