= Brow's Tavern =

- U.S. National Register of Historic Places
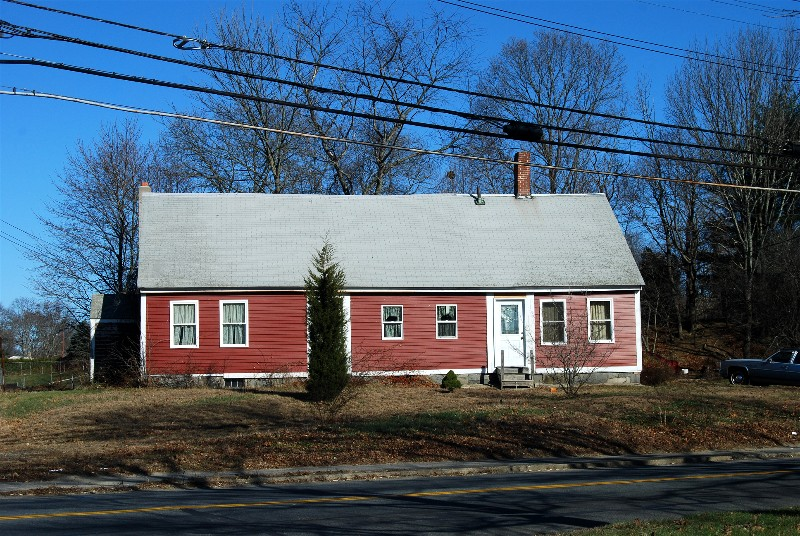
- 211 Tremont Street

- Location within Massachusetts Location within the United States
- Location: Taunton, Massachusetts
- Coordinates: 41°54′42″N 71°7′29″W
- Built: 1780
- Architectural style: Federal
- MPS: Taunton MRA
- NRHP reference No.: 84002094
- Added to NRHP: July 5, 1984

Brow's Tavern is a historic tavern (now a private residence) located at 211 Tremont Street in Taunton, Massachusetts. It was built circa 1780 and enlarged circa 1800. The tavern is reputed to have once served travelers on the Bristol Path, now known as Tremont Street.

The house was originally a five-bay Cape Cod style house featuring a narrow doorway with a transom. It was later expanded to the west.

The property was added to the National Register of Historic Places in 1984. However, the original doors have since been replaced and some of the original wood details have also been removed.

== See also ==
- National Register of Historic Places listings in Taunton, Massachusetts
