= Job Knapp House =

Historic house in Massachusetts, United States

- U.S. National Register of Historic Places
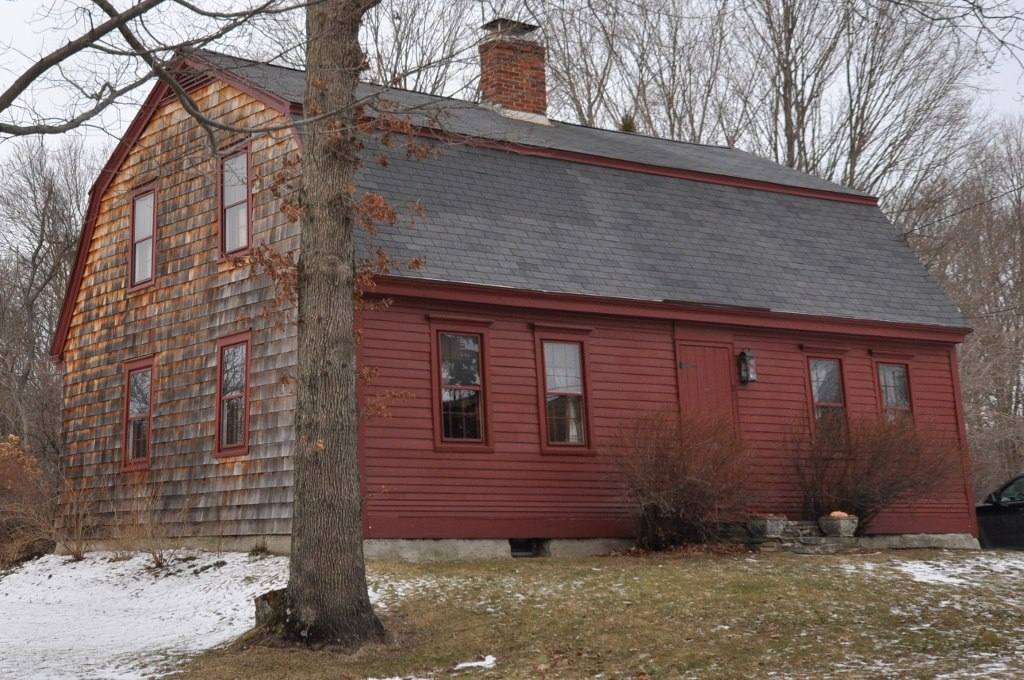

- Location within Massachusetts Location within the United States
- Location: 81 Shores Street, Taunton, Massachusetts
- Coordinates: 41°54′7″N 71°6′49″W
- Built: c. 1728
- Architectural style: Colonial
- MPS: Taunton MRA
- NRHP reference No.: 84002150
- Added to NRHP: July 5, 1984

The Job Knapp House is a historic house located at 81 Shores Street in Taunton, Massachusetts.

== Description and history ==
It is a 1 1/2-story wood-framed structure, five bays wide, with a side gable gambrel roof, a central chimney, and wood shingle siding. It has a narrow wood plank door flanked by sidelight windows. The house was built circa 1728, making it one of the oldest standing structures in the city. The gambrel roof is a particularly rare feature on houses of this period in Southeastern Massachusetts.

The house was added to the National Register of Historic Places on July 5, 1984.

== See also ==
- National Register of Historic Places listings in Taunton, Massachusetts
