= William L. White Jr. House =

Historic house in Massachusetts, United States

- U.S. National Register of Historic Places
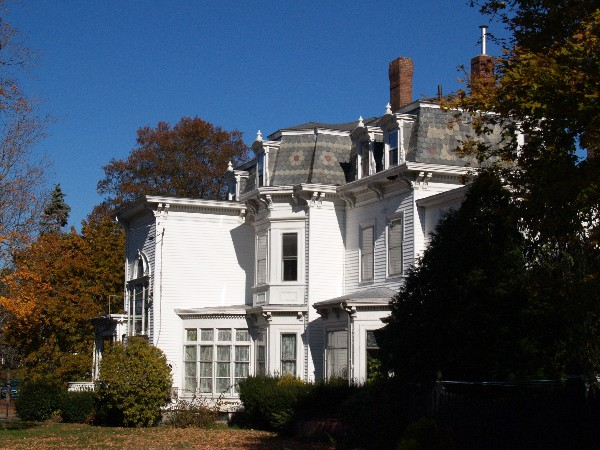

- Location within Massachusetts Location within the United States
- Location: 242 Winthrop Street, Taunton, Massachusetts
- Coordinates: 41°53′24″N 71°6′55″W
- Built: 1873
- Architectural style: Second Empire
- MPS: Taunton MRA
- NRHP reference No.: 84002268
- Added to NRHP: July 5, 1984

The William L. White Jr. House is a historic house located at 242 Winthrop Street in Taunton, Massachusetts.

== Description and history ==
This 2 1/2-story, wood-framed house was built in 1873 by William L. White for his son. The Whites were prominent local carriage builders. The house is locally significant as one of the city's largest and most elaborate examples of the Second Empire style of architecture, adorned with a flared mansard roof decorated in patterned slate, and a wraparound porch supported by clustered Tuscan columns.

The house was listed on the National Register of Historic Places on July 5, 1984.

== See also ==
- National Register of Historic Places listings in Taunton, Massachusetts
