= National Register of Historic Places listings in Taunton, Massachusetts =

List of Registered Historic Places in Taunton, Massachusetts, which has been transferred from and is an integral part of National Register of Historic Places listings in Bristol County, Massachusetts

Contents: Counties in Massachusetts

Barnstable | Berkshire | Bristol | Dukes | Essex | Franklin | Hampden | Hampshire | Middlesex | Nantucket | Norfolk | Plymouth | Suffolk | Worcester

This National Park Service list is complete through NPS recent listings posted March 27, 2026.

| | Name on the Register | Image | Date listed | Location | City or town | Description |
|---|---|---|---|---|---|---|
| 1 | Charles R. Atwood House | Charles R. Atwood House | July 5, 1984 (#84002087) | 30 Dean St. 41°54′14″N 71°04′59″W | Taunton | Occupied. |
| 2 | Barnum School | Barnum School | July 5, 1984 (#84002088) | 25 Barnum St. 41°53′40″N 71°05′45″W | Taunton | Occupied. |
| 3 | J.C. Bartlett House | J.C. Bartlett House | July 5, 1984 (#84002089) | 12 Walnut St. 41°53′47″N 71°05′50″W | Taunton | Occupied. |
| 4 | C.J.H. Bassett House | C.J.H. Bassett House | July 5, 1984 (#84002091) | 20 Chestnut St. 41°54′12″N 71°05′25″W | Taunton | Occupied. |
| 5 | W.C. Beattie House | W.C. Beattie House | July 5, 1984 (#84002092) | 289 W. Brittania St. 41°55′07″N 71°06′24″W | Taunton | Occupied. |
| 6 | Bristol County Courthouse Complex | Bristol County Courthouse Complex | March 28, 1978 (#78000427) | 9, 11, 15 Court St. 41°54′09″N 71°05′42″W | Taunton | |
| 7 | Brow's Tavern | Brow's Tavern | July 5, 1984 (#84002094) | 211 Tremont St. 41°54′42″N 71°07′29″W | Taunton | Occupied. |
| 8 | Henry G. Brownell House | Henry G. Brownell House | July 5, 1984 (#84002095) | 119 High St. 41°53′58″N 71°05′49″W | Taunton | Demolished in March 2014 |
| 9 | Buildings at 80 and 88 W. Brittania St. | Buildings at 80 and 88 W. Brittania St. | July 5, 1984 (#84002097) | 68 and 80 88 W. Brittania St. 41°54′48″N 71°06′07″W | Taunton | Occupied. |
| 10 | George Capron House | George Capron House | July 5, 1984 (#84002099) | 6 N. Pleasant St. 41°54′24″N 71°05′52″W | Taunton | Occupied. |
| 11 | Central Fire Station | Central Fire Station | July 5, 1984 (#84002101) | Leonard and School Sts. 41°54′14″N 71°05′32″W | Taunton | 3rd oldest occupied fire station in the nation. |
| 12 | Church Green | Church Green | December 16, 1977 (#77000168) | U.S. 44 and MA 140; 41°54′05″N 71°05′17″W | Taunton | |
| 13 | Cohannet Mill No. 3 | Cohannet Mill No. 3 | November 29, 2006 (#06001088) | 120 Ingell St. 41°53′14″N 71°05′13″W | Taunton | Restored as Robertson on the River Apartments. |
| 14 | Samuel Colby House | Samuel Colby House | July 5, 1984 (#84002103) | 74 Winthrop St. 41°53′50″N 71°05′55″W | Taunton | |
| 15 | Monsignor James Coyle High School | Monsignor James Coyle High School | February 3, 2025 (#100011424) | 61 Summer Street; 41°53′57″N 71°05′13″W | Taunton | Most recently the Taunton Catholic Middle School |
| 16 | Abiezar Dean House | Abiezar Dean House | July 5, 1984 (#84002104) | 57 Summer St. 41°54′00″N 71°05′17″W | Taunton | |
| 17 | George Dean House | George Dean House | July 5, 1984 (#84002105) | 135 Winthrop St. 41°53′42″N 71°06′16″W | Taunton | |
| 18 | Jonathan Dean House | Jonathan Dean House | July 5, 1984 (#84002106) | 175 Dean St. 41°54′23″N 71°04′04″W | Taunton | Demolished in mid-1990s. |
| 19 | Lloyd Dean House | Lloyd Dean House | July 5, 1984 (#84002107) | 164 Dean St. 41°54′22″N 71°04′09″W | Taunton | |
| 20 | Theodore Dean House | Theodore Dean House | July 5, 1984 (#84002108) | 26 Dean St. 41°54′13″N 71°05′02″W | Taunton | |
| 21 | Dean-Barstow House | Dean-Barstow House | July 5, 1984 (#84002109) | 275 Williams St. 41°52′58″N 71°02′58″W | Taunton | |
| 22 | Dean-Hartshorn House | Dean-Hartshorn House | July 5, 1984 (#84002111) | 68 Dean St. 41°54′14″N 71°04′52″W | Taunton | |
| 23 | East Taunton Fire Station | East Taunton Fire Station | July 5, 1984 (#84002112) | Middleboro Ave. 41°52′56″N 71°02′01″W | Taunton | |
| 24 | Eldridge House | Eldridge House | July 5, 1984 (#84002114) | 172 County St. 41°53′45″N 71°04′38″W | Taunton | |
| 25 | Fairbanks-Williams House | Fairbanks-Williams House | July 5, 1984 (#84002116) | 19 Elm St. 41°54′13″N 71°05′10″W | Taunton | |
| 26 | Albert Field Tack Company | Albert Field Tack Company | July 5, 1984 (#84002117) | 19 Spring St. 41°53′57″N 71°05′29″W | Taunton | |
| 27 | Fuller-Dauphin Estate | Fuller-Dauphin Estate | July 5, 1984 (#84002118) | 145 School St. 41°54′33″N 71°05′22″W | Taunton | |
| 28 | Gen. George Godfrey House | Gen. George Godfrey House | July 5, 1984 (#84002119) | 125 County St. 41°53′46″N 71°04′43″W | Taunton | |
| 29 | Richard Godfrey House | Richard Godfrey House | July 5, 1984 (#84002121) | 62 County St. 41°53′49″N 71°04′51″W | Taunton | |
| 30 | Harris Street Bridge | Harris Street Bridge | July 5, 1984 (#84002123) | Spans Taunton River at Dean and Harris Sts. 41°54′20″N 71°04′12″W | Taunton | |
| 31 | Sarah A. Haskins House | Sarah A. Haskins House | July 5, 1984 (#84002124) | 18 Harrison St. 41°53′49″N 71°05′38″W | Taunton | |
| 32 | Higgins-Hodgeman House | Higgins-Hodgeman House | July 5, 1984 (#84002128) | 19 Cedar St. 41°54′15″N 71°05′25″W | Taunton | |
| 33 | Hodges House | Hodges House | July 5, 1984 (#84002130) | 41 Worcester St. 41°55′10″N 71°09′01″W | Taunton | |
| 34 | Hopewell Mills District | Hopewell Mills District | July 5, 1984 (#84002133) | Bay St. and Albro Ave. 41°54′57″N 71°05′42″W | Taunton | |
| 35 | Hopewell School | Hopewell School | July 5, 1984 (#84003859) | Monroe St. 41°55′11″N 71°05′40″W | Taunton | |
| 36 | Kilmer Street Fire Station | Kilmer Street Fire Station | July 5, 1984 (#84002138) | Oak and Kilmer Sts. 41°53′58″N 71°06′25″W | Taunton | |
| 37 | King Airfield Hangar | King Airfield Hangar | July 5, 1984 (#84002141) | Middleboro Ave. 41°52′51″N 71°01′14″W | Taunton | |
| 38 | Job Knapp House | Job Knapp House | July 5, 1984 (#84002150) | 81 Shores St. 41°54′07″N 71°06′49″W | Taunton | |
| 39 | William Lawrence House | William Lawrence House | July 10, 1985 (#85001531) | 101 Somerset Ave. 41°53′36″N 71°05′36″W | Taunton | |
| 40 | Leonard School | Leonard School | July 5, 1984 (#84002155) | W. Brittania St. 41°55′03″N 71°06′32″W | Taunton | |
| 41 | James Leonard House | James Leonard House | July 5, 1984 (#84002152) | 3 Warren St. 41°54′51″N 71°06′28″W | Taunton | |
| 42 | Ambrose Lincoln Jr. House | Ambrose Lincoln Jr. House | July 5, 1984 (#84002157) | 1916 Bay St. 41°54′50″N 71°05′37″W | Taunton | |
| 43 | Asa Lincoln House | Asa Lincoln House | July 5, 1984 (#84002159) | 171 Shores St. 41°54′03″N 71°07′29″W | Taunton | |
| 44 | Gen. Thomas Lincoln House | Gen. Thomas Lincoln House | July 5, 1984 (#84002162) | 104 Field St. 41°57′24″N 71°05′56″W | Taunton | |
| 45 | Lord-Baylies-Bennett House | Lord-Baylies-Bennett House | July 5, 1984 (#84002165) | 66 Winthrop St. 41°53′52″N 71°05′50″W | Taunton | Commonly known as the Masonic Lodge |
| 46 | Lothrop Memorial Building-G.A.R. Hall | Lothrop Memorial Building-G.A.R. Hall | July 5, 1984 (#84002168) | Washington and Governor Sts. 41°54′13″N 71°06′29″W | Taunton | |
| 47 | H. B. Lothrop Store | H. B. Lothrop Store | July 5, 1984 (#84002166) | 210 Weir St. 41°53′46″N 71°06′14″W | Taunton | |
| 48 | Calvin T. Macomber House | Calvin T. Macomber House | July 5, 1984 (#84002174) | 312 W. Brittania St. 41°55′06″N 71°06′25″W | Taunton | |
| 49 | Theodore L. Marvel House | Theodore L. Marvel House | July 5, 1984 (#84002176) | 188 Berkley St. 41°52′46″N 71°05′23″W | Taunton | |
| 50 | N. S. Mason House | N. S. Mason House | July 5, 1984 (#84002178) | 58 Tremont St. 41°54′18″N 71°06′24″W | Taunton | |
| 51 | McKinstrey House | McKinstrey House | July 5, 1984 (#84002181) | 115 High St. 41°53′58″N 71°05′50″W | Taunton | |
| 52 | Morse House | Morse House | July 5, 1984 (#84002185) | 6 Pleasant St. 41°54′14″N 71°05′41″W | Taunton | |
| 53 | Henry Morse House | Henry Morse House | July 5, 1984 (#84002183) | 32 Cedar St. 41°54′13″N 71°05′26″W | Taunton | |
| 54 | Mount Pleasant Cemetery | Mount Pleasant Cemetery | December 5, 2002 (#02001474) | Crocker, Cohannet, and Barnum Sts. 41°53′42″N 71°05′59″W | Taunton | |
| 55 | Neck of Land Cemetery | Neck of Land Cemetery | July 10, 1985 (#85001530) | Summer St. 41°53′52″N 71°05′09″W | Taunton | |
| 56 | North Taunton Baptist Church | North Taunton Baptist Church | July 5, 1984 (#84002188) | 1940 Bay St. 41°54′52″N 71°05′41″W | Taunton | |
| 57 | Old Colony Iron Works-Nemasket Mills Complex | Old Colony Iron Works-Nemasket Mills Complex | July 5, 1984 (#84002190) | Old Colony Ave. 41°53′09″N 71°01′38″W | Taunton | |
| 58 | Old Colony Railroad Station | Old Colony Railroad Station | July 5, 1984 (#84002192) | 40 Dean St. 41°54′16″N 71°04′56″W | Taunton | |
| 59 | Old Weir Stove Company | Old Weir Stove Company | July 5, 1984 (#84002194) | W. Water St. 41°52′57″N 71°05′34″W | Taunton | |
| 60 | Alfred Paull House | Alfred Paull House | July 5, 1984 (#84002196) | 467 Weir St. 41°53′20″N 71°05′26″W | Taunton | |
| 61 | Pilgrim Congregational Church | Pilgrim Congregational Church | July 5, 1984 (#84002199) | 45 Broadway; 41°54′14″N 71°05′39″W | Taunton | |
| 62 | Reed and Barton Complex | Reed and Barton Complex | July 5, 1984 (#84002207) | W. Brittania and Danforth Sts. 41°55′05″N 71°06′06″W | Taunton | |
| 63 | M.M. Rhodes and Sons Co. | M.M. Rhodes and Sons Co. | August 29, 2016 (#16000570) | 12 Porter St. 41°53′54″N 71°05′57″W | Taunton | |
| 64 | St. Mary's Complex | St. Mary's Complex | July 5, 1984 (#84002211) | Broadway and Washington St. 41°54′27″N 71°05′39″W | Taunton | |
| 65 | St. Thomas Episcopal Church | St. Thomas Episcopal Church | July 5, 1984 (#84002213) | 115 High St. 41°53′50″N 71°05′27″W | Taunton | |
| 66 | School Street School | School Street School | July 5, 1984 (#84002214) | School and Fruit Sts. 41°54′12″N 71°06′03″W | Taunton | |
| 67 | Sylvanus N. Staples House | Sylvanus N. Staples House | July 5, 1984 (#84002217) | 21 Second St. 41°53′11″N 71°05′37″W | Taunton | |
| 68 | Stone House | Stone House | July 5, 1984 (#84002219) | 15-17 Plain St. 41°53′05″N 71°05′17″W | Taunton | |
| 69 | Albert Sweet House | Albert Sweet House | July 5, 1984 (#84002221) | 179 Highland St. 41°53′34″N 71°06′58″W | Taunton | |
| 70 | Taunton Alms House | Taunton Alms House | July 5, 1984 (#84002223) | Norton Ave. 41°55′07″N 71°07′57″W | Taunton | |
| 71 | Taunton Green Historic District | Taunton Green Historic District | March 1, 1985 (#85000547) | Broadway, Taunton Green, Main and Court Sts. 41°54′08″N 71°05′40″W | Taunton | |
| 72 | Taunton Public Library | Taunton Public Library | July 5, 1984 (#84002225) | Pleasant St. 41°54′12″N 71°05′41″W | Taunton | |
| 73 | Taunton State Hospital | Taunton State Hospital | January 21, 1994 (#93001484) | W bank of the Mill R. at Danforth St. 41°54′42″N 71°06′06″W | Taunton | Partially destroyed by fire |
| 74 | H.P. Thomas House | H.P. Thomas House | July 5, 1984 (#84002228) | 322 Somerset Ave. 41°53′16″N 71°05′39″W | Taunton | |
| 75 | Tisdale-Morse House | Tisdale-Morse House | July 5, 1984 (#84002231) | 17 Fayette Pl. 41°54′15″N 71°05′28″W | Taunton | |
| 76 | Union Congregational Church | Union Congregational Church | July 5, 1984 (#84002232) | W. Brittania and Rockland Sts. 41°55′10″N 71°06′20″W | Taunton | |
| 77 | Union Mission Chapel-Historical Hall | Union Mission Chapel-Historical Hall | July 5, 1984 (#84002235) | Cedar St. 41°54′13″N 71°05′30″W | Taunton | |
| 78 | US Post Office-Taunton Main | US Post Office-Taunton Main | October 19, 1987 (#86003476) | 37 Taunton Green; 41°54′06″N 71°05′41″W | Taunton | |
| 79 | Capt. David Vickery House | Capt. David Vickery House | July 5, 1984 (#84002254) | 33 Plain St. 41°53′04″N 71°05′13″W | Taunton | |
| 80 | Vickery-Baylies House | Vickery-Baylies House | July 5, 1984 (#84002252) | 56 Summer St. 41°53′59″N 71°05′15″W | Taunton | |
| 81 | Walker School | Walker School | July 5, 1984 (#84002257) | Berkley St. 41°52′56″N 71°03′11″W | Taunton | |
| 82 | Peter Walker House | Peter Walker House | July 5, 1984 (#84002256) | 1679 Somerset Ave. 41°51′26″N 71°06′55″W | Taunton | |
| 83 | Samuel Washburn House | Samuel Washburn House | July 5, 1984 (#84002258) | 68 Winthrop St. 41°53′50″N 71°05′52″W | Taunton | |
| 84 | Washington School | Washington School | July 5, 1984 (#84002261) | 40 Vernon St. 41°53′45″N 71°06′22″W | Taunton | |
| 85 | Weir Engine House | Weir Engine House | July 5, 1984 (#84002263) | 530 Weir St. 41°53′15″N 71°05′23″W | Taunton | |
| 86 | Westville Congregational Church | Westville Congregational Church | July 5, 1984 (#84002266) | Winthrop and N. Walker Sts. 41°53′08″N 71°08′17″W | Taunton | |
| 87 | William L. White Jr. House | William L. White Jr. House | July 5, 1984 (#84002268) | 242 Winthrop St. 41°53′24″N 71°06′55″W | Taunton | |
| 88 | Whittenton Fire and Police Station | Whittenton Fire and Police Station | July 5, 1984 (#84002271) | Bay St. 41°55′14″N 71°05′49″W | Taunton | |
| 89 | Whittenton Mills Complex | Whittenton Mills Complex | July 5, 1984 (#84002275) | Mill River and Whittenton St. 41°55′27″N 71°06′21″W | Taunton | |
| 90 | Abiathar King Williams House | Abiathar King Williams House | July 5, 1984 (#84002278) | 43 Ingell St. 41°53′36″N 71°05′02″W | Taunton | |
| 91 | Enoch Williams House | Enoch Williams House | July 5, 1984 (#84002280) | 616 Middleboro Ave. 41°52′57″N 71°01′26″W | Taunton | |
| 92 | Francis D. Williams House | Francis D. Williams House | July 5, 1984 (#84002282) | 3 Plain St. 41°53′07″N 71°05′21″W | Taunton | |
| 93 | N.S. Williams House | N.S. Williams House | July 5, 1984 (#84002285) | 1150 Middleboro Ave. 41°52′55″N 71°00′03″W | Taunton | |
| 94 | Joseph Willis House | Joseph Willis House | July 5, 1984 (#84002286) | 28 Worcester St. 41°54′59″N 71°08′51″W | Taunton | |
| 95 | Winslow Congregational Church | Winslow Congregational Church | July 5, 1984 (#84002288) | 61 Winthrop St. 41°53′55″N 71°05′50″W | Taunton | Demolished late 1990s. |
| 96 | Winthrop Street Baptist Church | Winthrop Street Baptist Church | July 5, 1984 (#84002291) | 39 Winthrop St. 41°54′01″N 71°05′46″W | Taunton | |
| 97 | William Woodward House | William Woodward House | July 10, 1985 (#85001529) | 117 Arlington St. 41°54′17″N 71°04′57″W | Taunton | |

== See also ==
- List of National Historic Landmarks in Massachusetts
