= M.M. Rhodes and Sons Company =

- U.S. National Register of Historic Places
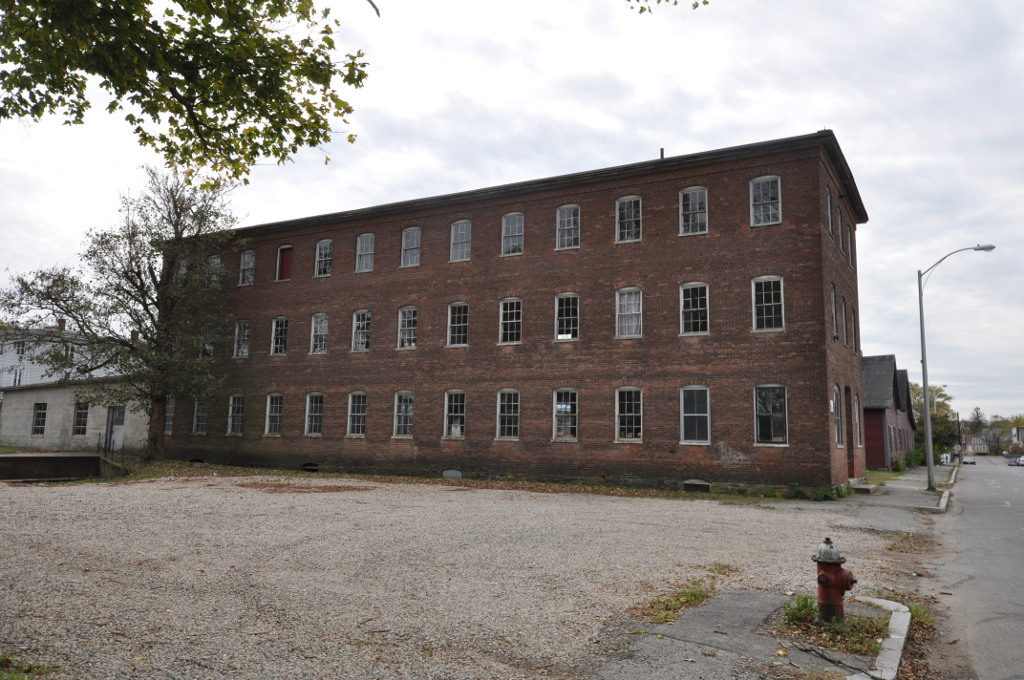

- Location within Massachusetts Location within the United States
- Location: 12 Porter St., Taunton, Massachusetts
- Coordinates: 41°53′54″N 71°5′57″W
- Area: 1.9 acres (0.77 ha)
- Built: 1861
- Architectural style: Early Commercial
- MPS: Taunton MRA
- NRHP reference No.: 84002207

The M.M. Rhodes and Sons Company is a historical button factory complex at 12 Porter Street in Taunton, Massachusetts. Established in 1861 and operational until 2014, it was one of the first successful papier-mâché shoe button manufacturers in the United States. Its surviving factory complex is one of the last early 20th-century complexes left on Taunton's once heavily industrialized south side. The complex was listed on the National Register of Historic Places in 2016.

== Description and history ==
The Rhodes Company factory is a complex of seven connected buildings, occupying 1.9 acres (0.77 ha) on the southeast side of Porter Street, southwest of downtown Taunton. Its main building, constructed in 1880, is a long three-story brick structure oriented perpendicular to the street. The other buildings of the complex are attached to this one, roughly forming a U shape with a central courtyard that is open to Porter Street. The oldest building on the site, is a c. 1865 wood frame building that extends along Porter Street southwest of the main building. This building was expanded several times between 1865 and about 1922.

The M.M. Rhodes and Sons Company was founded in 1861 by Marcus Morton Rhodes, when he first began renting space on this site. Rhodes manufactured a variety of items, including parts for hoop skirts and a variety of nails and tacks. He eventually designed a papier-mâché shoe button-making machine, and this became one of the mainstays of the company business after supplies from France were cut off by the 1870 Franco-Prussian War. This prompted him to enlarge the physical plant, building the main plant that served the company until its closure in 2014. It remained a family-run business during this entire period.

== See also ==
- National Register of Historic Places listings in Taunton, Massachusetts
