= Albert Sweet House =

Historic house in Massachusetts, United States

- U.S. National Register of Historic Places
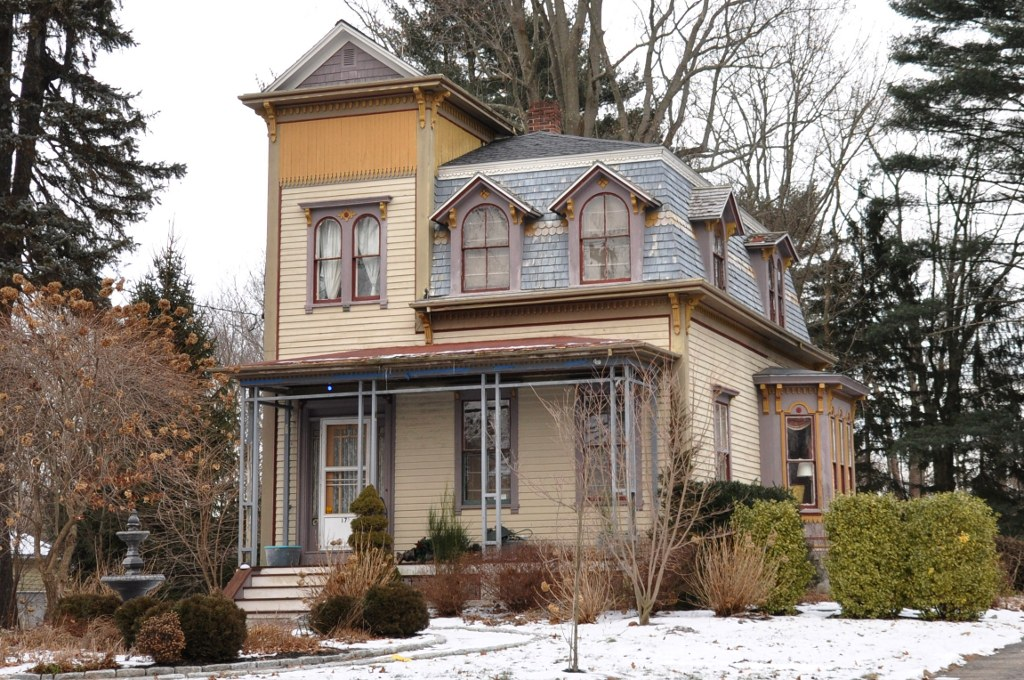

- Location within Massachusetts Location within the United States
- Location: 179 Highland St., Taunton, Massachusetts
- Coordinates: 41°53′34″N 71°6′58″W
- Built: c. 1875
- Architectural style: Second Empire
- MPS: Taunton MRA
- NRHP reference No.: 84002221
- Added to NRHP: July 5, 1984

The Albert Sweet House is a historic house located at 179 Highland Street in Taunton, Massachusetts.

== Description and history ==
The 1 1/2-story, wood-framed house was built sometime in the 1870s, and is a particularly picturesque example of Second Empire styling. It features a mansard roof, with bracketed gable dormers framing round-arch windows, and an off-center entry topped by a 2-1/2 story tower. The cornices of the tower roof, the main roof, and that of a side rectangular bay are all decorated with brackets.

The house was listed on the National Register of Historic Places on July 5, 1984.

== See also ==
- National Register of Historic Places listings in Taunton, Massachusetts
