= Gen. Thomas Lincoln House =

Historic house in Massachusetts, United States

- U.S. National Register of Historic Places
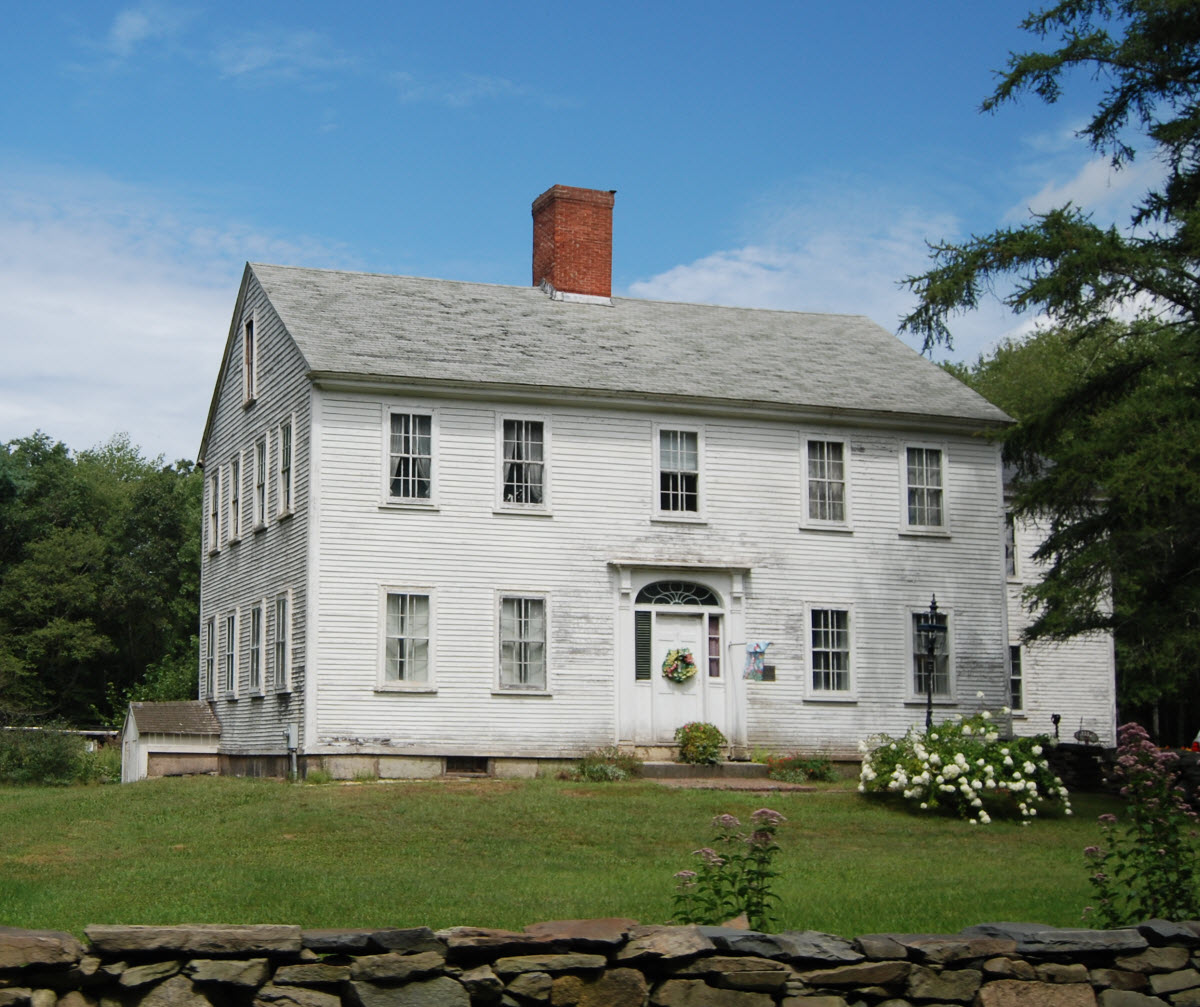
- 104 Field Street

- Location within Massachusetts Location within the United States
- Location: 104 Field St., Taunton, Massachusetts
- Coordinates: 41°57′24″N 71°5′56″W
- Built: 1805
- Architectural style: Federal
- MPS: Taunton MRA
- NRHP reference No.: 84002162
- Added to NRHP: July 5, 1984

The Gen. Thomas Lincoln House is a historic house located at 104 Field Street in Taunton, Massachusetts.

== Description and history ==
It was built in 1805 for Thomas Lincoln, who served in the American Revolutionary War and was appointed to the rank of brigadier general in 1809. The large 2 1/2-story, Federal Period, central chimney house is built on a traditional 5 × 4 plan, with a side-gabled roof and a large central chimney. Its entrance surround is one of the finest of the period in the city, with a tapered pilasters, dentil moulding, and a semi-elliptical fanlight.

It was added to the National Register of Historic Places on July 5, 1984.

== See also ==
- National Register of Historic Places listings in Taunton, Massachusetts
