= Capt. David Vickery House =

Historic house in Massachusetts, United States

- U.S. National Register of Historic Places
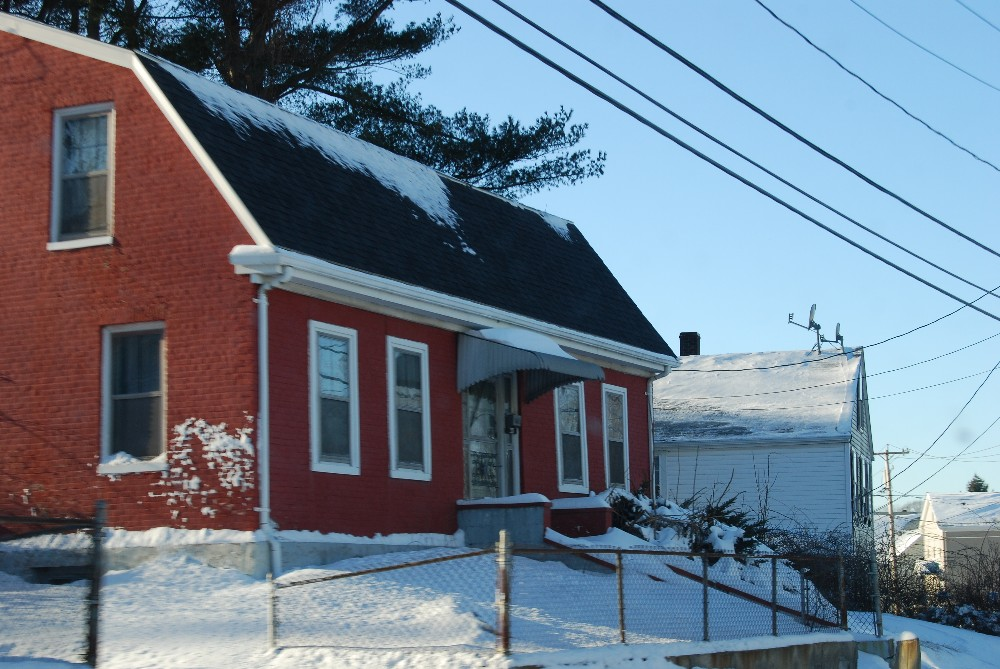
- 33 Plain Street

- Location within Massachusetts Location within the United States
- Location: Taunton, Massachusetts
- Coordinates: 41°53′4″N 71°5′13″W
- Built: 1795
- MPS: Taunton MRA
- NRHP reference No.: 84002254
- Added to NRHP: July 5, 1984

The Capt. David Vickery House is an historic house at 33 Plain Street in Taunton, Massachusetts. It is a 1 1/2-story brick structure, five bays wide, with a side gambrel roof. It has Federal style framing around its front windows, with granite lintels beneath windows on the side elevation. The house was built c. 1795 by David Vickery, a captain of seafaring ships who traveled as far as the West Indies. It is a rare surviving brick gambrel from the Federal period, and also rare for its connection to the city's maritime trade.

The house was listed on the National Register of Historic Places in 1984.

== See also ==
- National Register of Historic Places listings in Taunton, Massachusetts
