= Abiathar King Williams House =

Historic house in Massachusetts, United States

- U.S. National Register of Historic Places
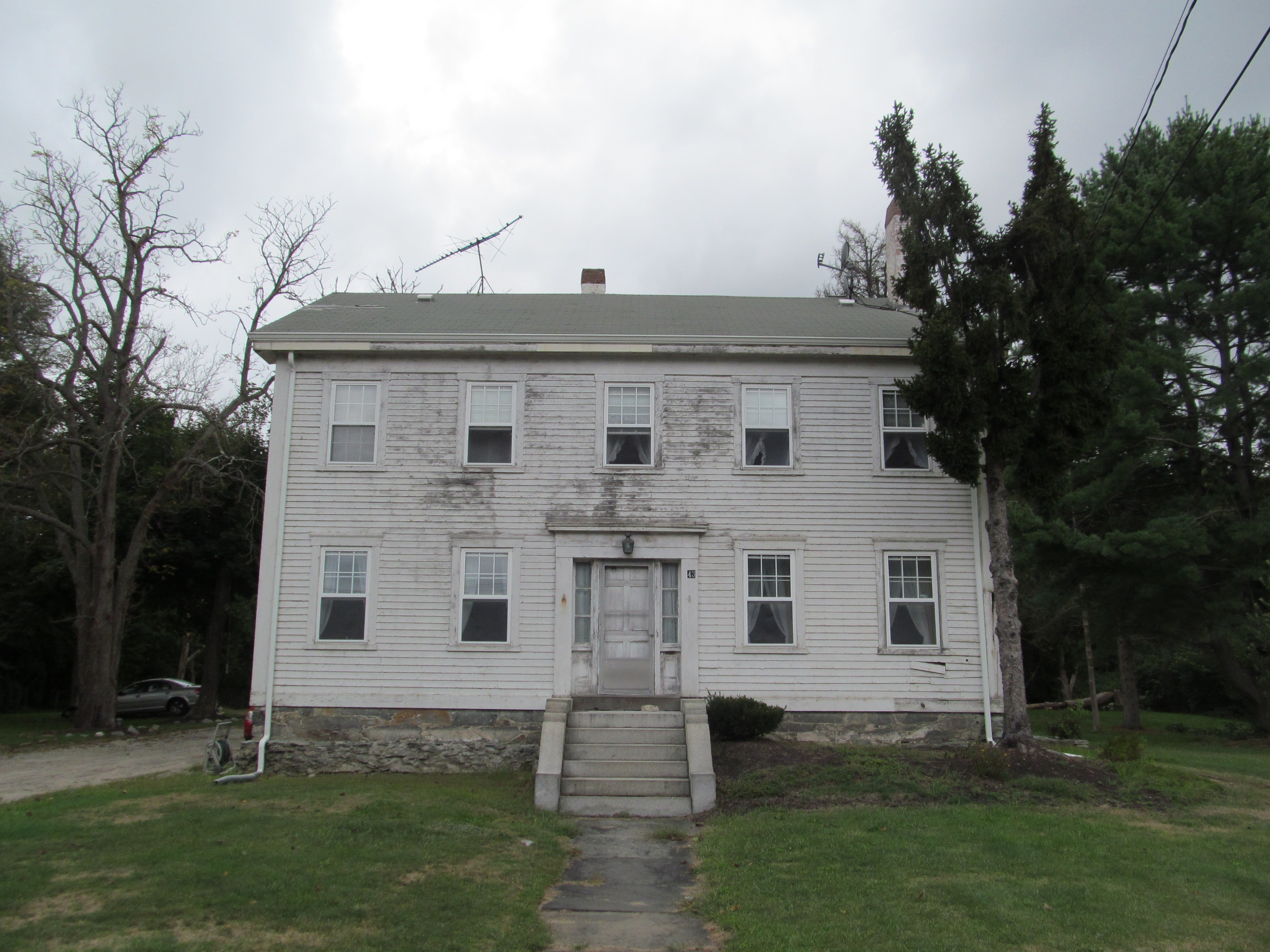

- Location within Massachusetts Location within the United States
- Location: 43 Ingell St., Taunton, Massachusetts
- Coordinates: 41°53′36″N 71°5′2″W
- Built: 1843
- Architectural style: Greek Revival
- MPS: Taunton MRA
- NRHP reference No.: 84002278
- Added to NRHP: July 5, 1984

The Abiathar King Williams House is a historic house located at 43 Ingell Street in Taunton, Massachusetts, United States.

== Description and history ==
The 2 1/2-story, wood-framed house was begun in 1843 by Abiathar King Williams, a member of the locally prominent Williams family, and finished by his brother George. It has simple vernacular Greek Revival styling, mainly in its front door surround, which has sidelight windows, and pilasters supporting an entablature. The Williams family was an economically significant force in the area; its descendants still owned the house in 1984.

The house was listed on the National Register of Historic Places on July 5, 1984.

== See also ==
- National Register of Historic Places listings in Taunton, Massachusetts
