= Henry G. Brownell House =

Historic house in Massachusetts, United States

- U.S. National Register of Historic Places
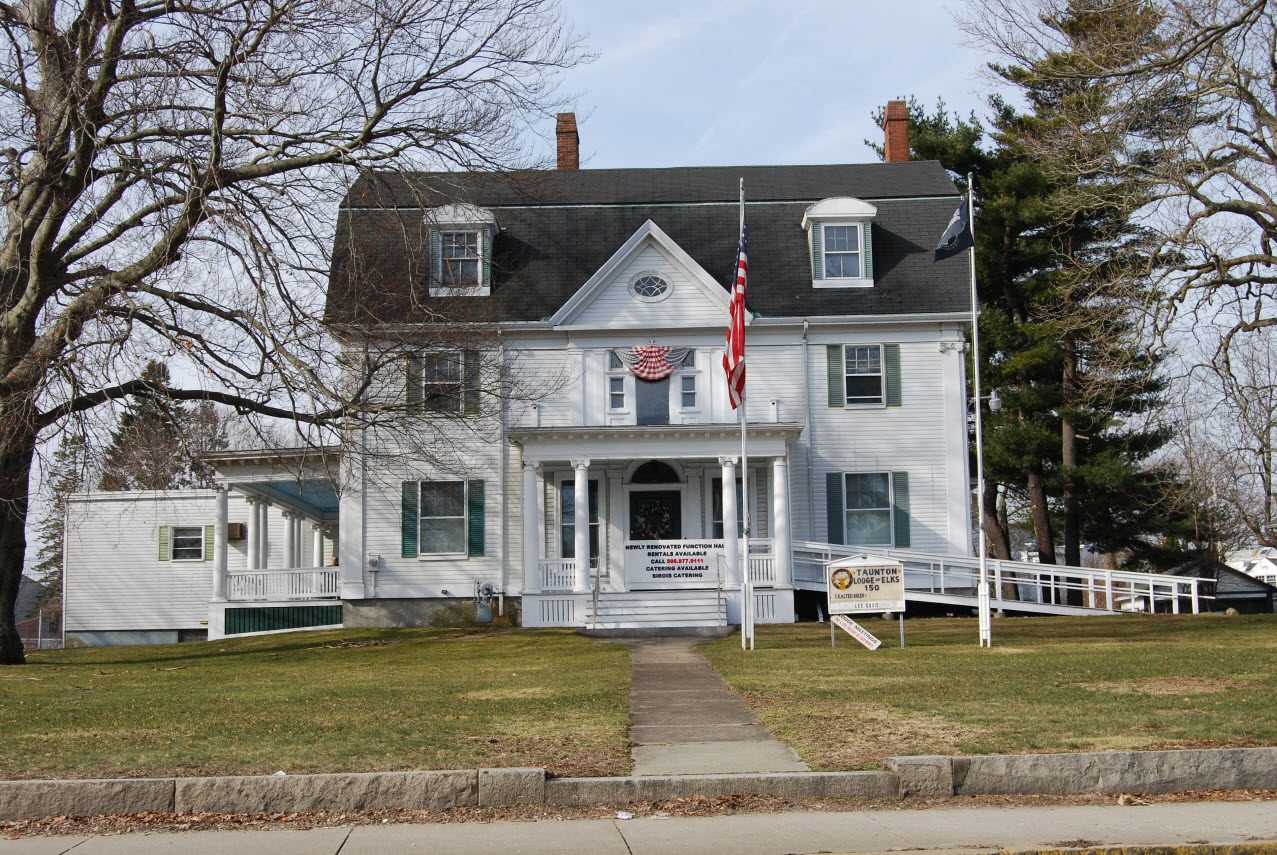
- The house in 2009

- Location within Massachusetts Location within the United States
- Location: 119 High St., Taunton, Massachusetts
- Coordinates: 41°53′58″N 71°5′49″W
- Built: 1893
- Architect: Witherell, L.M.
- Architectural style: Colonial Revival
- MPS: Taunton MRA
- NRHP reference No.: 84002095
- Added to NRHP: July 5, 1984

The Henry G. Brownell House was a historic house located at 119 High Street in Taunton, Massachusetts. Built in 1893, it was a high quality local example of Georgian Colonial Revival architecture. For many years it was home to the local Elks Lodge, and it was listed on the National Register of Historic Places in 1984 for its architecture. It was demolished in 2014.

== Description and history ==
The Henry G. Brownell House stood southwest of downtown Taunton, on the south side of High Street just north of its junction with Winthrop Street. It was a 2 1/2-story wood-frame structure, with a gambrel roof, end chimneys, and clapboarded exterior. The steep part of the gambrel roof was pierced by two symmetrically placed dormers with rounded tops, and there was a small gable rising above the central bay. The building corners were pilastered, and the front entry was sheltered by a wide and deep porch, supported by round columns. A three-part Palladian style window was set above the entrance, flanked by paired pilasters and topped by a transom window.

The house was built in 1893 for Henry G. Brownell by local contractor-builder L.M. Witherell, and was one of the city's finest examples of high-style Colonial Revival architecture, and was listed on the National Register of Historic Places in 1984 for its architecture. It most recently served as an Elks Lodge until early 2014, when it was sold to Arista Development. The house was demolished on March 18, 2014, and a Walgreens pharmacy has since been built on the site.

== See also ==
- National Register of Historic Places listings in Taunton, Massachusetts
