= Sarah A. Haskins House =

Historic house in Massachusetts, United States

- U.S. National Register of Historic Places
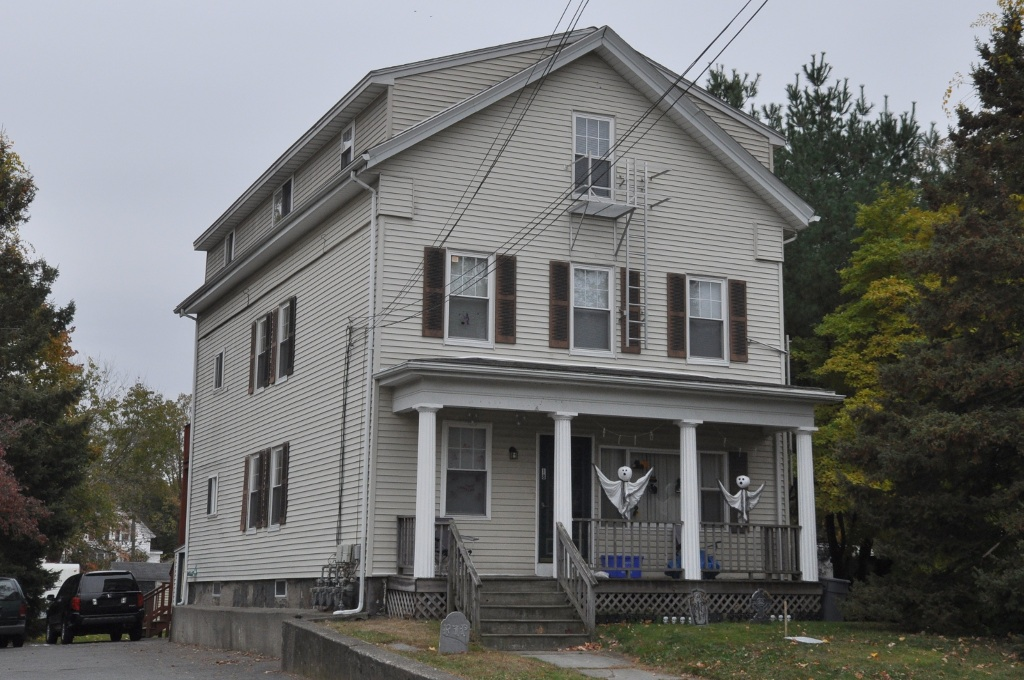

- Location within Massachusetts Location within the United States
- Location: Taunton, Massachusetts
- Coordinates: 41°53′49″N 71°5′38″W
- Built: 1852
- Architectural style: Greek Revival, Italianate
- MPS: Taunton MRA
- NRHP reference No.: 84002124
- Added to NRHP: July 5, 1984

The Sarah A. Haskins House is a historic house located at 18 Harrison Street in Taunton, Massachusetts, United States. It was built in 1852 in the Greek Revival style with transitional Italianate details. The 2 1/2-story side-hall plan house originally featured clapboard siding with decorative wood Greek Revival elements including pilastered corner boards and a front porch with fluted wood columns and decorative ironwork.

It was added to the National Register of Historic Places in 1984. However, the house has since been covered with vinyl siding and stripped of its original decorative elements, including original windows and shutters. Two shed dormers have also been added to the top floor.

== See also ==
- National Register of Historic Places listings in Taunton, Massachusetts
