= Leonard School =

- U.S. National Register of Historic Places
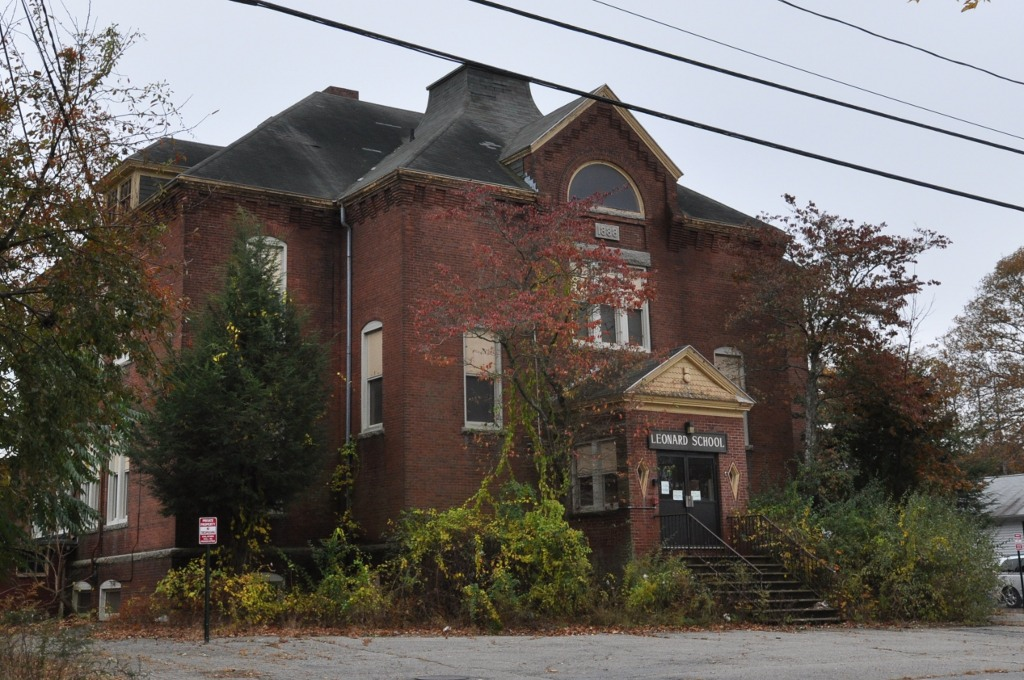

- Location within Massachusetts Location within the United States
- Location: Taunton, Massachusetts
- Coordinates: 41°55′04″N 71°06′29″W
- Built: 1888
- Architect: Gustavus L. Smith
- Architectural style: Italianate
- MPS: Taunton MRA
- NRHP reference No.: 84002155
- Added to NRHP: July 5, 1984

The Leonard School is a historic school building at 356 West Britannia Street in Taunton, Massachusetts. It is a two-story brick structure, with a hip roof and a projecting front section that is topped by a truncated tower. A large gable in front of this tower is filled by a large half-round window. An enclosed gable-roof porch shelters the main entrance. Built in 1888 in the Italianate style, it is one of several local schools designed by Gustavus L. Smith. It is named after the locally prominent Leonard family, who were leaders in the city's industrial development.

It was added to the National Register of Historic Places in 1984. It closed in 2009.

== See also ==
- National Register of Historic Places listings in Taunton, Massachusetts
