= Winslow Congregational Church =

Historic church in Massachusetts, United States

- U.S. National Register of Historic Places
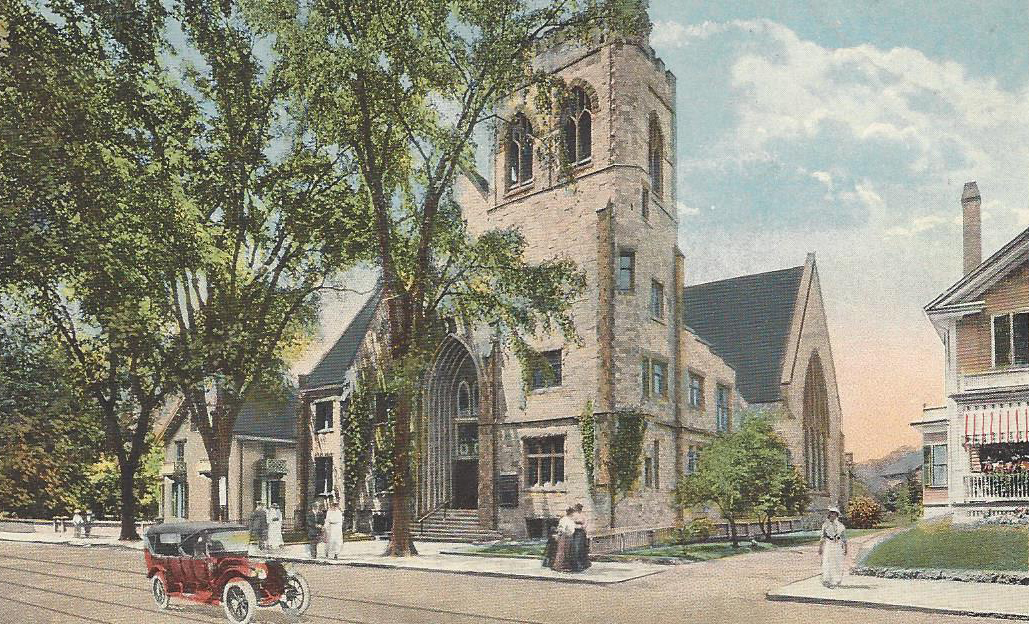
- Winslow Congregational Church, c. 1913

- Location within Massachusetts Location within the United States
- Location: Taunton, Massachusetts
- Coordinates: 41°53′55″N 71°5′50″W
- Built: 1897
- Architectural style: Gothic
- MPS: Taunton MRA
- NRHP reference No.: 84002288
- Added to NRHP: July 5, 1984

Winslow Congregational Church was a historic church building located at 61 Winthrop Street in Taunton, Massachusetts. The church was built in 1897 and added to the National Historic Register in 1984. At that time, it was considered one of the city's "most impressive" 19th century churches, with its sandstone construction and Gothic detailing.

In 1969, the historic church building was sold to the First Portuguese Baptist Church, founded in 1932 for bilingual worship services in English and Portuguese. The congregation was renamed the Baptist Church of All Nations in 1977. The historic 1897 church was later demolished and replaced with a new building.

== See also ==
- National Register of Historic Places listings in Taunton, Massachusetts
