= Stone House (Taunton, Massachusetts) =

Historic house in Massachusetts, United States

- U.S. National Register of Historic Places
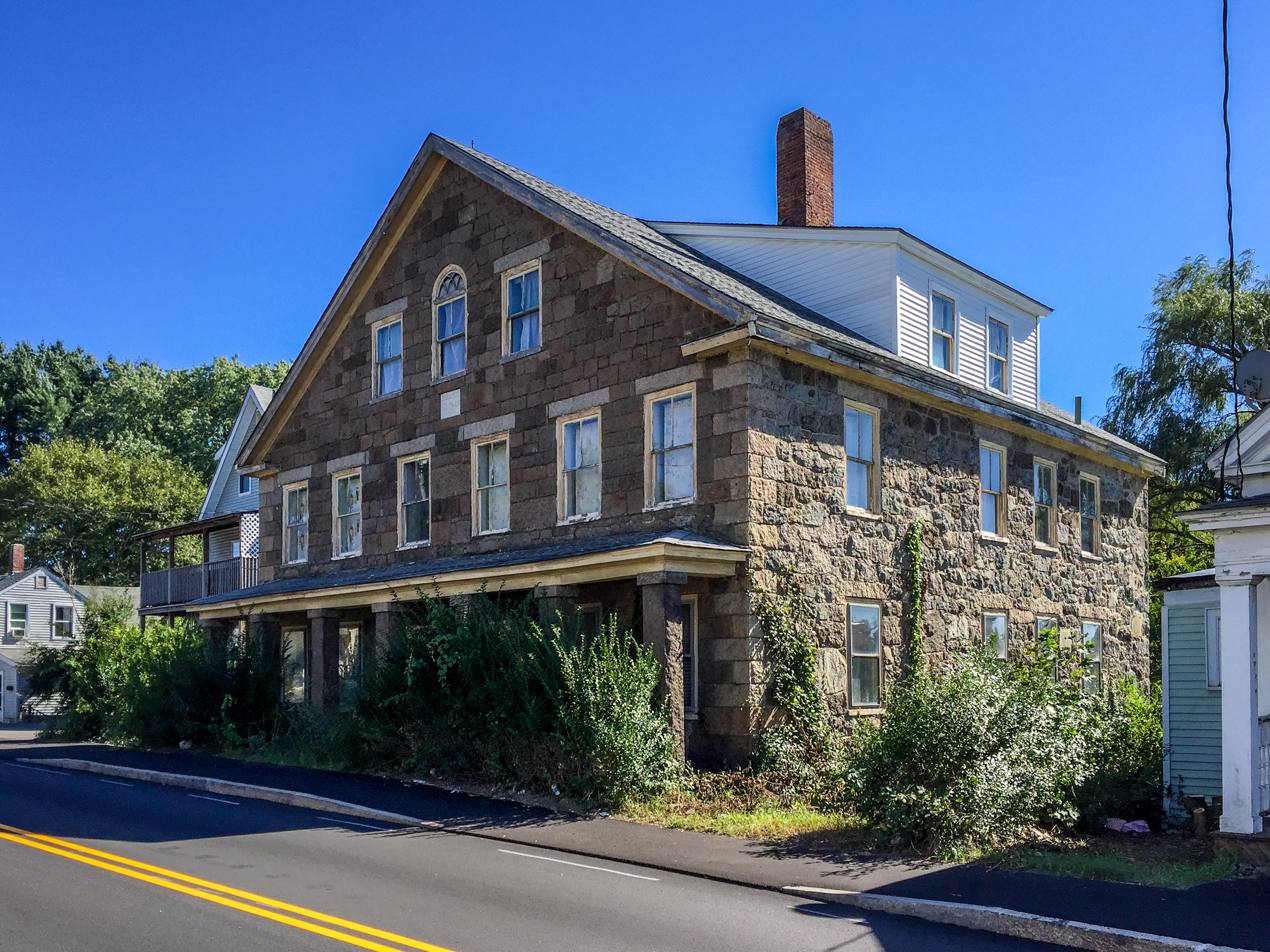
- 15-17 Plain Street

- Location within Massachusetts Location within the United States
- Location: Taunton, Massachusetts
- Coordinates: 41°53′5″N 71°5′17″W
- Built: 1847
- Architectural style: Greek Revival
- MPS: Taunton MRA
- NRHP reference No.: 84002219
- Added to NRHP: July 5, 1984

The Stone House is an historic house at 15-17 Plain Street in Taunton, Massachusetts. Built in 1847, this 2 1/2-story stone structure is one of only two stone houses built in Taunton in the 19th century. Its walls are fashioned out of coursed granite, and it has a single-story porch across its front facade, supported by stone piers. It was operated as a hostelry for seamen in the employ of some of Taunton's shipping magnates.

The house was listed on the National Register of Historic Places in 1984.

== See also ==
- National Register of Historic Places listings in Taunton, Massachusetts
