= Alfred Paull House =

Historic house in Massachusetts, United States

- U.S. National Register of Historic Places
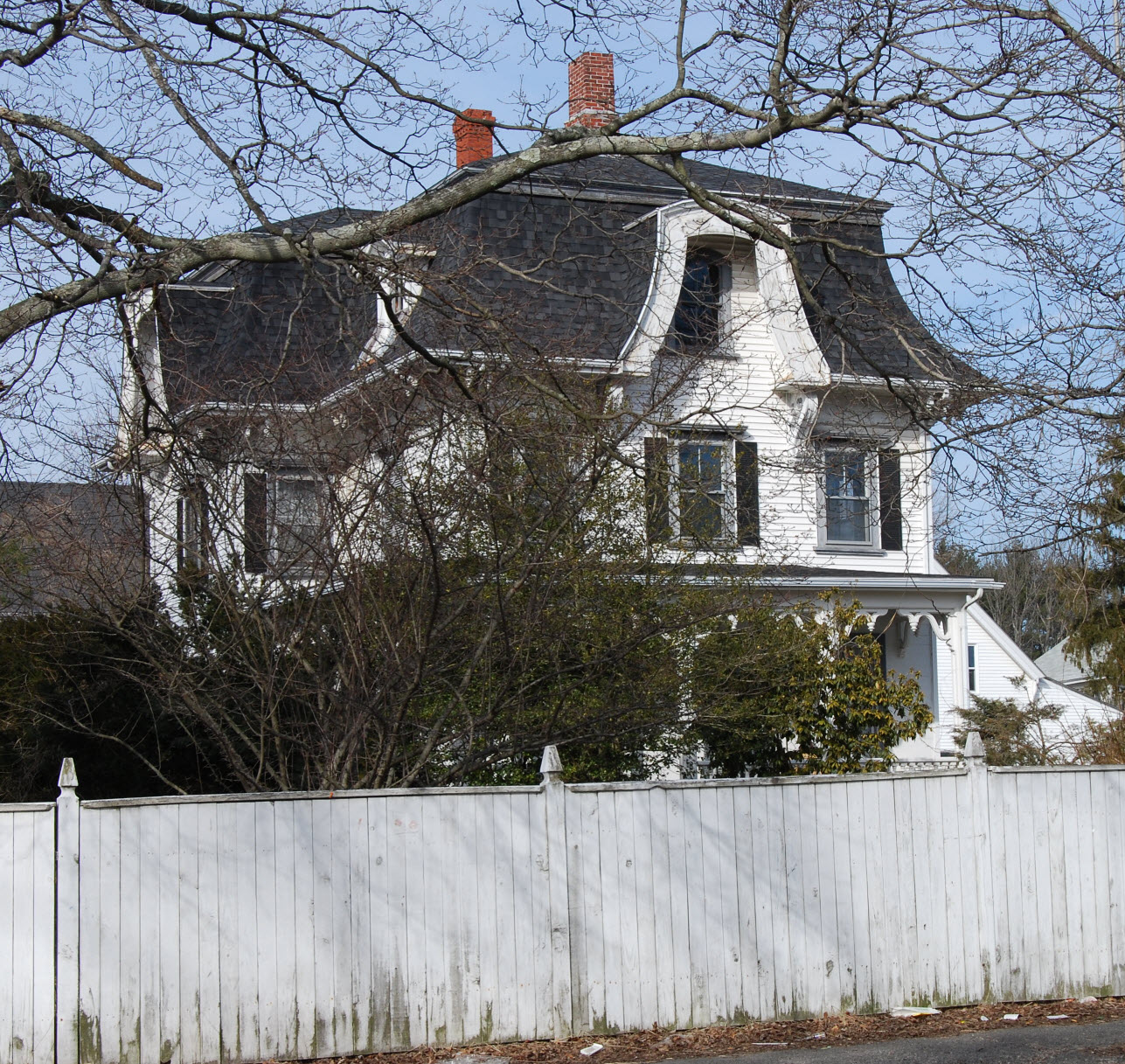
- 467 Weir Street

- Location within Massachusetts Location within the United States
- Location: 467 Weir St., Taunton, Massachusetts
- Coordinates: 41°53′20″N 71°5′26″W
- Built: c. 1860
- Architect: n/a
- Architectural style: Second Empire, Stick/Eastlake
- MPS: Taunton MRA
- NRHP reference No.: 84002196
- Added to NRHP: July 5, 1984

The Alfred Paull House is a historic house located at 467 Weir Street in Taunton, Massachusetts.

== Description and history ==
It is a two-story, wood-framed structure, roughly square in shape, with a tall bell-cast mansard roof. A porch extends across the front and around to one side, with chamfered posts and a decorative valance with curved pendant brackets. Similar brackets adorn the main roof cornice. The house was built in about 1860 by Alfred Paull, who was, along with his brother James, a leading developer of the area. It is one of the city's most ornate Second Empire houses.

The house was listed on the National Register of Historic Places on July 5, 1984.

== See also ==
- National Register of Historic Places listings in Taunton, Massachusetts
