= Paull (surname) =

Paull is a surname, and may refer to:

- Andy Paull (1892–1959), Squamish leader from British Columbia, Canada
- Edith Helen Paull (1902–1975), Indian medical nurse
- E. T. Paull (1858–1924), American musician
- Gilbert Paull (1896–1983), British judge
- Grace Paull (1898–1990), American artist, illustrator and author
- Henry Paull (1824–1898), British barrister and politician
- Irene Levine Paull (1908–1981), American writer and labor activist
- James Paull (moderator) (1782–1858), minister of the Church of Scotland
- James Paull (West Virginia politician) (1901–1983), American lawyer and politician
- James Paull (judge) (1818–1875), American lawyer, politician and judge
- James Paull (MP) (1770–1808), British politician
- James Paull (musician) (1957–2008), Australian guitarist in the band TISM
- Jennifer Paull (born 1944), English musician, publisher, lecturer, and author
- Laline Paull, British novelist
- Lawrence G. Paull (1938–2019), American movie production designer and art director
- Morgan Paull (1944–2012), American actor
- Nathan Paull (born 2003), Australian soccer player
- Nicki Paull (born 1962), Australian actor
- Pemi Paull, Canadian viola soloist
- Richard Paull (born 1944), English cricketer
- Susanna Mary Paull (1812–1888) was a British author and translator, as Mrs. H. B. Paull
- William Paull (baritone) (c.1872–1903), British baritone singer
- William Paull (politician) (1846–1926), Australian company director and politician
