= First Parish Church =

First Parish Church may refer to one of several churches and church buildings in the United States:

== Maine ==
- First Parish Meetinghouse (Biddeford, Maine), listed on the NRHP in Maine
- First Parish Church (Brunswick, Maine)
- First Parish Church (Portland, Maine)
- First Parish Meetinghouse (Standish, Maine)
- First Parish Congregational Church, Yarmouth

== Massachusetts ==
- First Parish Church Parsonage, Arlington
- First Parish Church of Dorchester
- First Parish Church (Duxbury, Massachusetts)
- First Parish Unitarian Church, Medfield
- First Parish Church in Plymouth
- United First Parish Church (Quincy, Massachusetts)
- First Parish Unitarian Universalist Church of Scituate
- First Parish Church (Taunton, Massachusetts)
- First Parish Church (Waltham, Massachusetts)

== New Hampshire ==
- First Parish Church (Dover, New Hampshire)
- First Parish Church Site-Dover Point, Dover
