= Elizabeth Poole =

English settler in Plymouth Colony (1588–1654)

Elizabeth Poole (Pole)
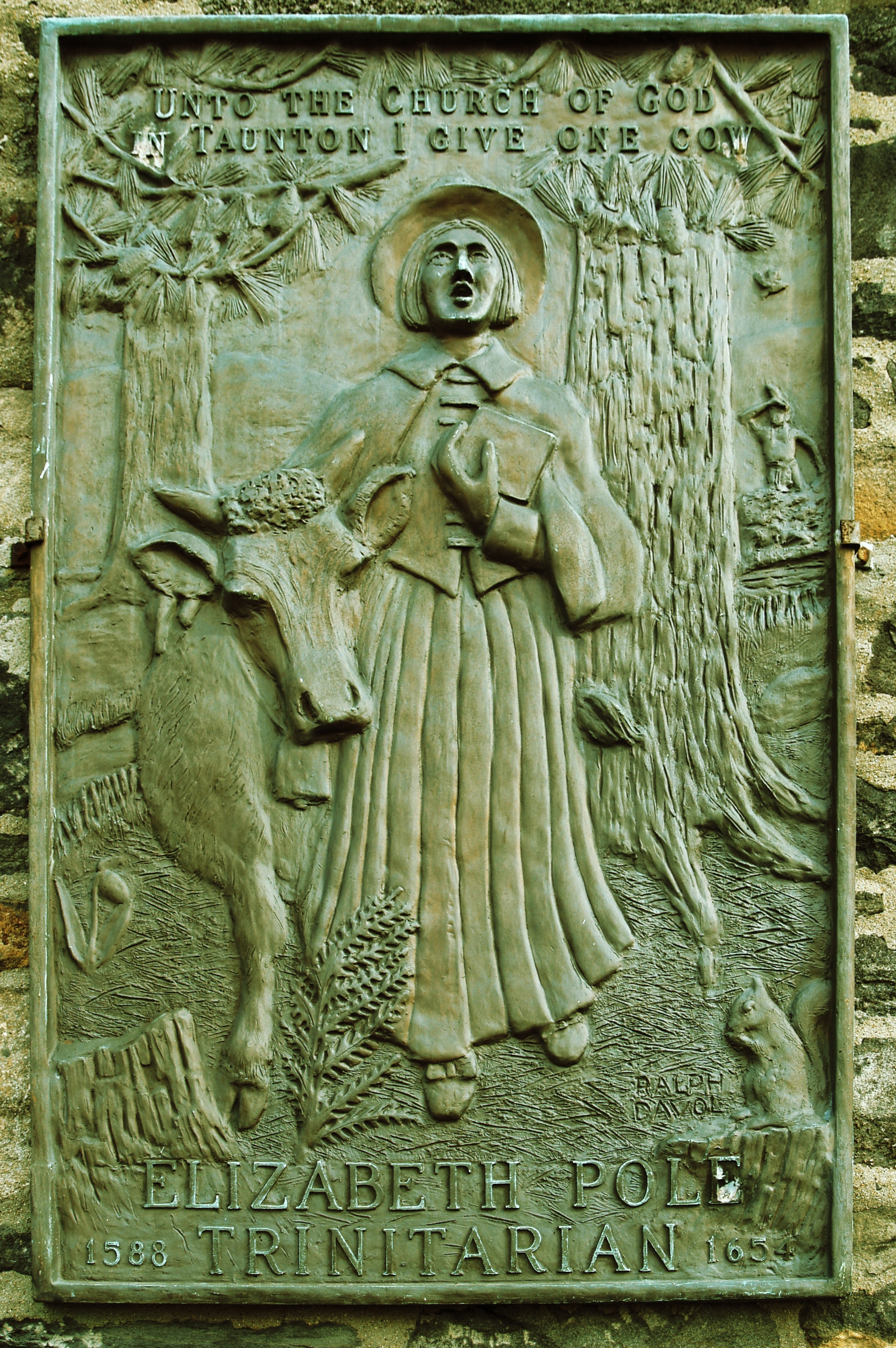
- Plaque on the front of the Pilgrim Congregational Church (Taunton, Massachusetts)
- Born: August 25, 1588; East Devon, England
- Died: May 21, 1654 (aged 65)
- Known for: Founding Taunton, Massachusetts

Elizabeth Poole or Pole (25 August 1588 – 21 May 1654) was an English settler in Plymouth Colony who founded the town of Taunton, Massachusetts. She was the first woman known to have founded a town in the Americas.

== Biography ==
Poole was a well-born woman from Shute in East Devon, near Axminster. She was the daughter of Sir William Pole, who was knighted by James I in 1601, and Mary Peryam, the daughter of Sir William Peryam, Lord Chief Baron of the Exchequer. Until 2009, her family's descendants, the Pole-Carews, lived in the Devonshire house she was born in, Shute Barton, a National Trust property which is open to the public on four weekends during the year. (The property is now refurbished and let by the Trust as holiday accommodation).

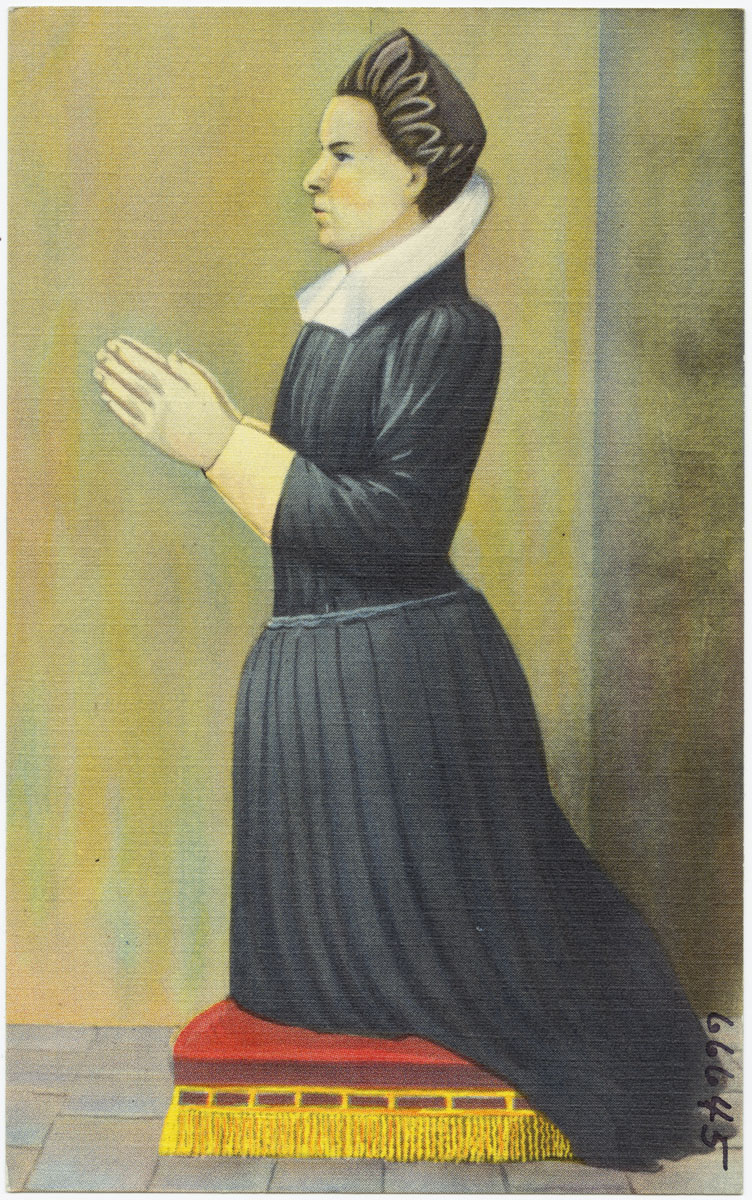
Color representation of Elizabeth Pole

Elizabeth sailed from Plymouth, England in 1633 on the Speedwell with two friends, fourteen servants, goods, and twenty tons of salt for fishing provision. She intended to form a settlement and for the conversion of the Native Americans to Christianity. Although the Taunton town seal depicts Poole purchasing land from the local Wampanoag Indians, she was not actually involved in the original transaction. However, together with her brother William Poole, she acquired a large section of this land in 1637. This led to the development of the Taunton settlement in 1638. The next year, on 3 March 1639, the settlement was officially incorporated.

At her time of death in 1654, she was a wealthy spinster who had built her own house with an orchard which was occupied by her brother as well as a second home she purchased from Robert Thornton. She was one of the few women at that time who left a will leaving her property, including a 40-acre meadow, to John Poole, her nephew and merchant in Boston.

The inscription on her gravestone reads:

Here rest the remains of Elizabeth Poole, a native of Old England, of good family, friends, and prospects, all which she left in the prime of her life, to enjoy the religion of her conscience, in this distant wilderness; a great proprietor of the township of Taunton, a chief promoter of its settlement, and its incorporation in 1639-40; about which time she settled near this spot, and having employed the opportunity of her virgin state in piety, liberality, and sanctity of manners, died May 21, 1654, aged 65.

== Bible ==
Her Geneva Bible sold for £20,000 in January 2023.

== See also ==
- First Parish Church (Taunton, Massachusetts)
- Neck of Land Cemetery
