= Newburyport Silver Company =

Former American Silversmithing Company (1904-1914)

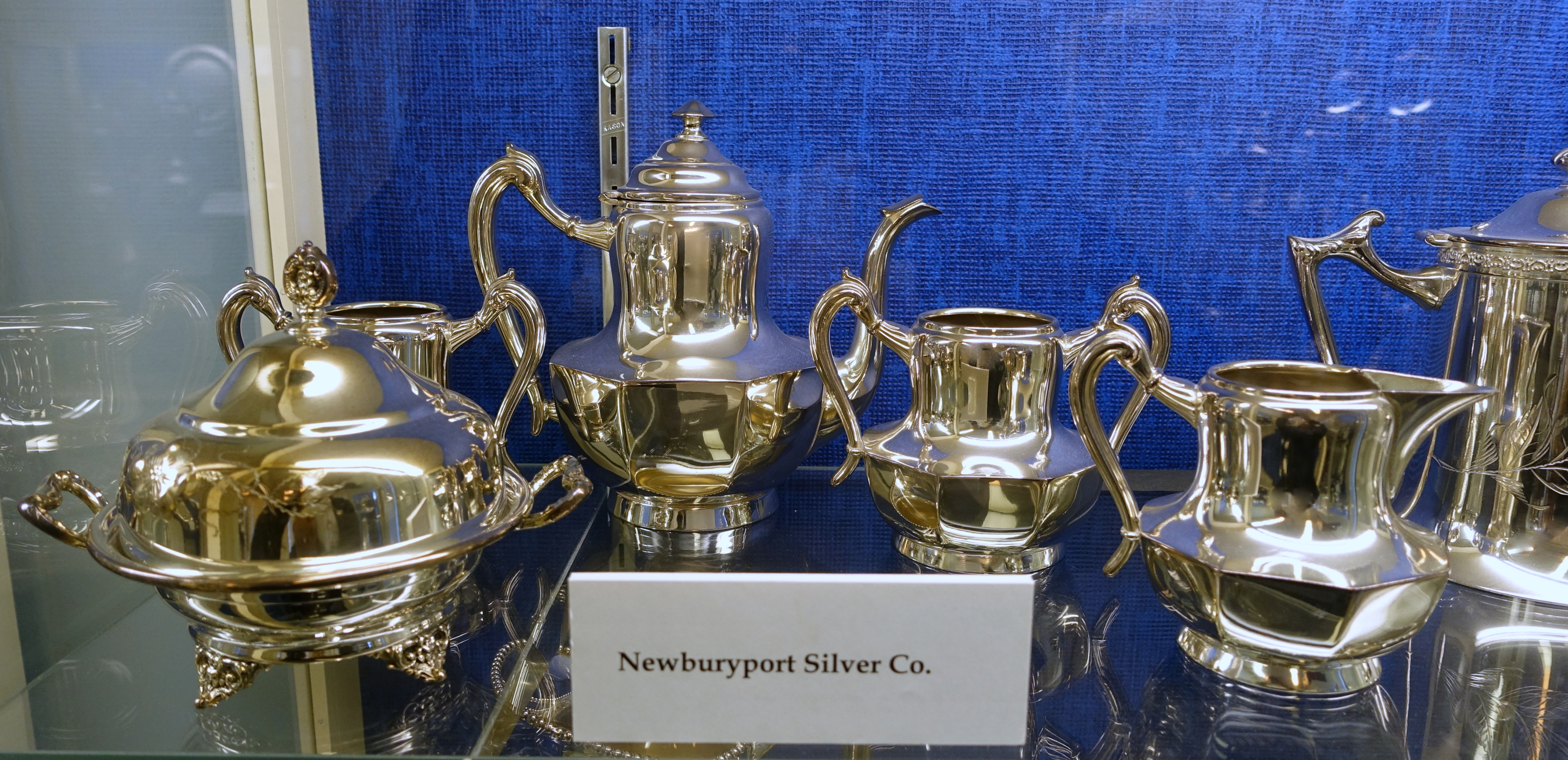
Newburyport Silver Company display in the Old Colony History Museum

The Newburyport Silver Company was an American silversmithing company, active from 1904 to 1914 in Keene, New Hampshire. It was founded in 1902 by 7 men in Newburyport, Massachusetts. In 1904 production moved to Keene and by 1908 the firm employed about 40 craftsmen and a dozen salesman. It produced sterling silver products, such as flatware and candlesticks, for New England and national markets, but ceased operation in 1915.
