= Reed and Barton Complex =

- U.S. National Register of Historic Places
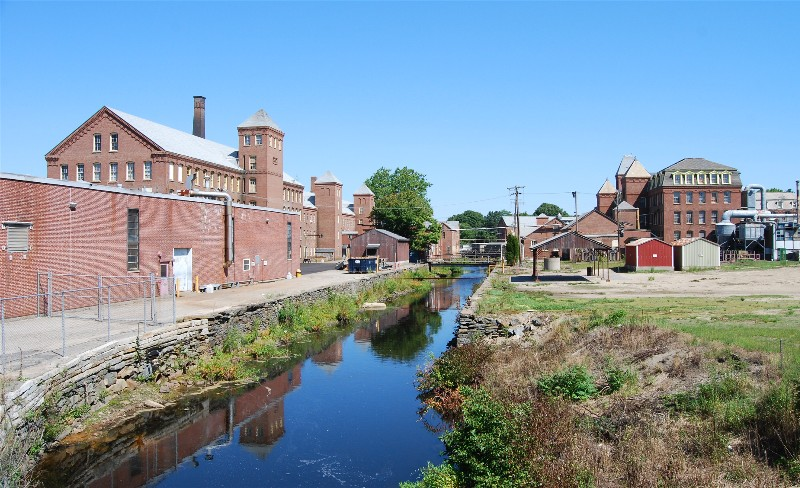

- Location within Massachusetts Location within the United States
- Location: Taunton, Massachusetts
- Coordinates: 41°55′5″N 71°6′6″W
- Area: 14 acres (5.7 ha)
- Built: 1830
- Architectural style: Early Commercial
- MPS: Taunton MRA
- NRHP reference No.: 84002207
- Added to NRHP: July 5, 1984

The Reed and Barton Complex is a historic industrial complex at West Brittania and Danforth Streets in Taunton, Massachusetts. It is the site of one of Taunton's first and largest industries, now known as Reed & Barton, a privately held silversmithing business that operated from 1824 to 2015. The company's success was instrumental in Taunton becoming known as the "Silver City". The complex was listed on the National Register of Historic Places in 1984.

== Description and history ==
The Reed and Barton Complex occupies 14 acres (5.7 ha) of land straddling the Mill River, north of Taunton's central business district. It is bounded on the north by West Britannia Street, on the west by Barton Street, and to the south and east by Danforth Street. The core of the complex is two series of connected brick buildings, built between 1830 and 1890, that flank the river banks. Perpendicular to the series on the east bank of the river is a mansard-roofed three-story building that housed the company's executive offices and showrooms. A number of later 20th-century buildings occupy outlying parts of the property. The complex also includes two surviving instances of mill worker housing, which were built on the mill property c. 1855.

Henry Reed and Charles Barton moved their business to this site in 1830, and rapidly developed an international reputation for their pewterware. Reed & Barton was incorporated in 1888, and expanded into silver production, acquiring smaller companies as it grew. Reed & Barton filed for Chapter 11 bankruptcy in February 2015, citing ongoing pension liabilities and decreasing revenue.

== See also ==
- National Register of Historic Places listings in Taunton, Massachusetts
