= Neck of Land Cemetery =

Historic cemetery in Massachusetts, United States

- U.S. National Register of Historic Places
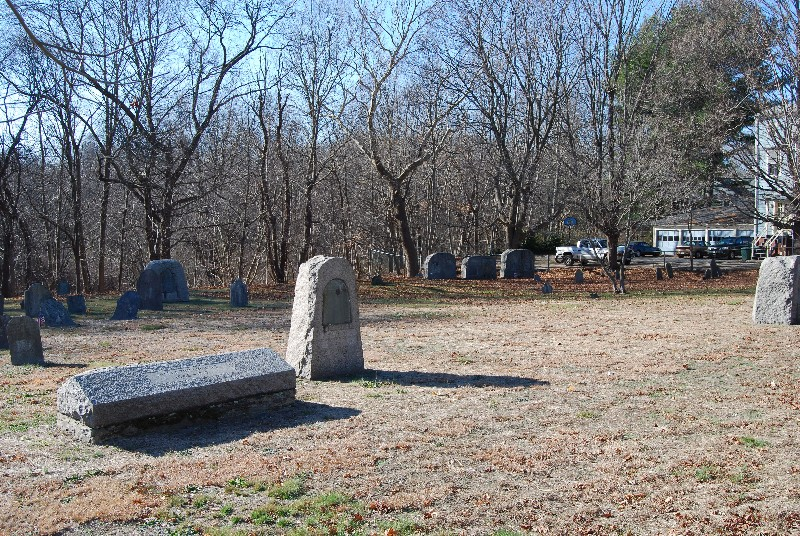

- Location within Massachusetts Location within the United States
- Location: Taunton, Massachusetts
- Coordinates: 41°53′52″N 71°5′9″W
- Built: 1687
- MPS: Taunton MRA
- NRHP reference No.: 85001530
- Added to NRHP: July 10, 1985

The Neck of Land Cemetery is a small historic cemetery on Summer Street in Taunton, Massachusetts. Established in 1687 near the confluence of the Mill and Taunton Rivers, it was the city's first cemetery. Most of its graves predate 1800; there are four burials before 1700, including two children. The cemetery is a roughly rectangular plot, about 0.5 acres (0.20 ha) in size, on the south side of Summer Street, between Prospect and West Summer Streets. The most significant individual buried in the cemetery is Taunton founder and first female colonial land claimer Elizabeth Poole.

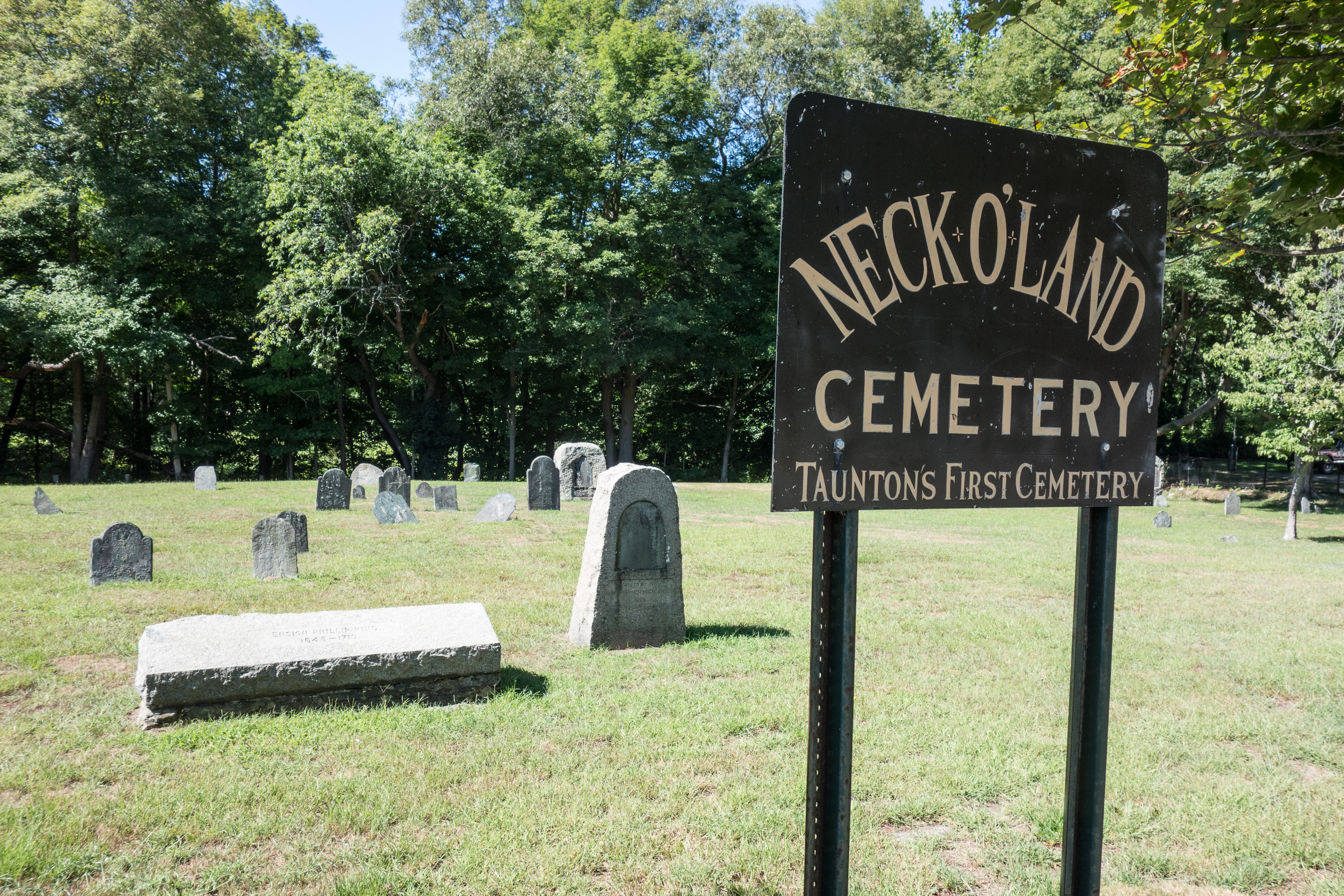
Entry Sign

The cemetery was listed on the National Register of Historic Places in 1985.

== See also ==
- National Register of Historic Places listings in Taunton, Massachusetts
