= Reed & Barton =

American silverware company, 1824–2015

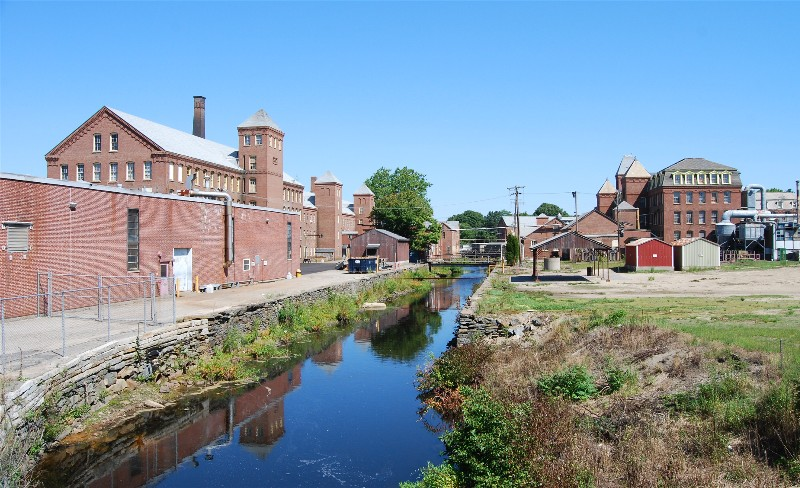
- Reed and Barton Complex, Taunton, Massachusetts
- Industry: Silversmith
- Founded: 1824; 202 years ago
- Defunct: February 2015
- Fate: Bankruptcy
- Headquarters: Taunton, Massachusetts, United States

Reed & Barton was a prominent American silversmith manufacturer based in the city of Taunton, Massachusetts, operating between 1824 and 2015. Its products include flatware of sterling silver and silverplate, but the company originally focused on britannia metal; it sold varying items of these alloys since Henry G. Reed and Charles E. Barton took over the failing works of Isaac Babbitt in Taunton. During the American Civil War, Reed & Barton produced a considerable quantity of weapons for Union Army soldiers and officers.

== History highlights ==
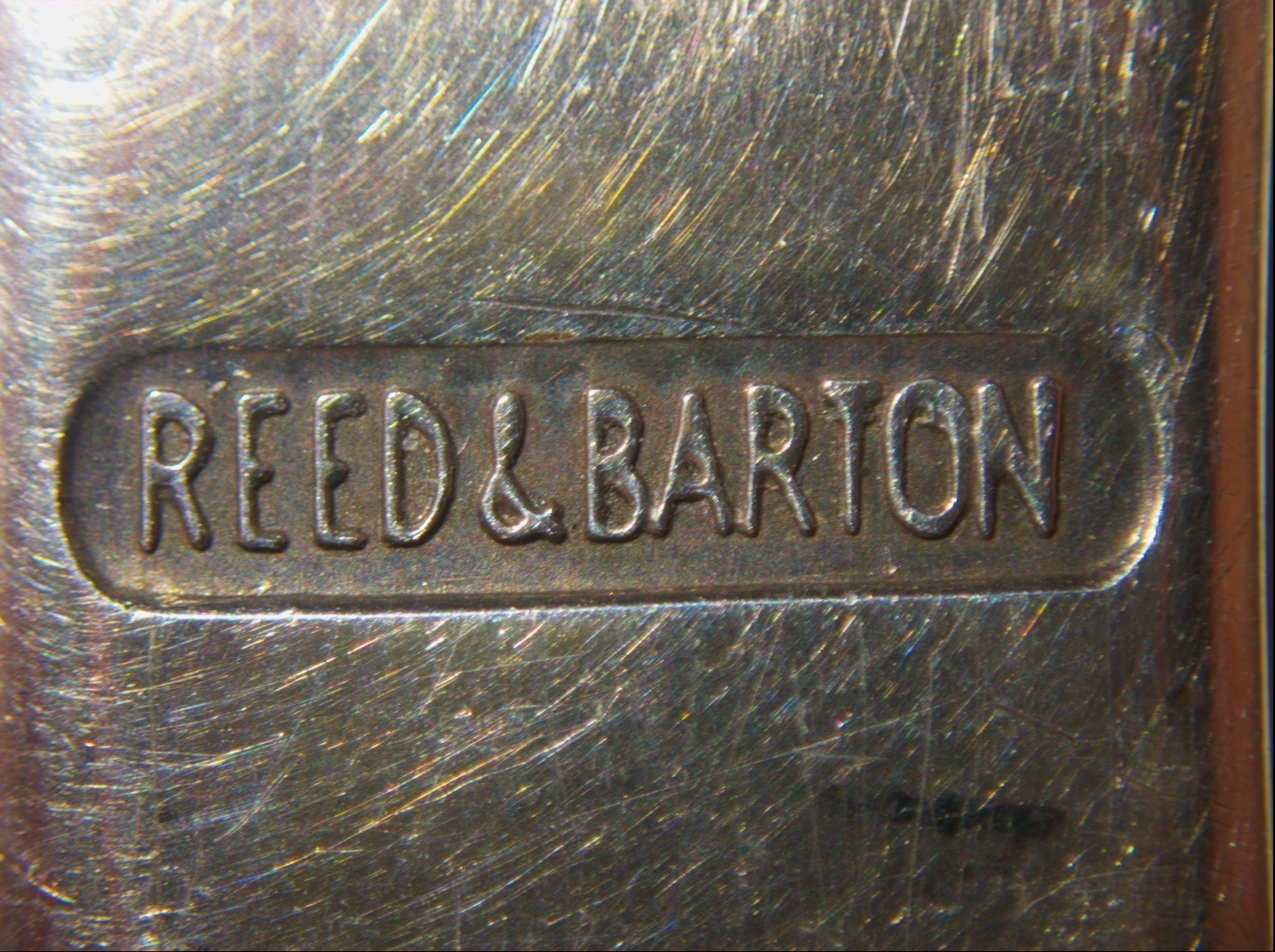
Pocket watch chain made by Reed & Barton

Reed & Barton was originally founded as Babbitt & Crossman in Taunton, Massachusetts, in 1824. Babbitt & Crossman, which produced Britannia ware, was first owned by Isaac Babbitt. However, the company was slowly losing money, so the failing company was purchased by Henry G. Reed and business partner Charles E. Barton.

In 1928, Reed & Barton merged with silversmith Dominick & Haff.

Reed & Barton was chosen to design and produce the official gold, silver, and bronze medals for the 1996 Summer Olympics in Atlanta, of which there are samples on display at the Old Colony History Museum in Taunton. The company's products are used at the White House in Washington, D.C. Today, the company operates a factory store at the plant site, an outlet store at Wrentham Premium Outlets in Wrentham, Massachusetts, and an online store as well.

== Other operations ==
The company remained privately owned by the family of Henry Reed. Besides the flatware, Reed & Barton operated other brands as well:

- Reed & Barton Handcrafted Chests, the world's largest manufacturer of handmade chests, cigar humidors, pen chests, and hardwood flatware.
- Miller Rogaska Crystal, handmade stemware.
- Sheffield Collection, a company started in 1908 and purchased by Reed & Barton in 1973.
- Everyday stainless steel flatware designed for durability (and modern conveniences like dishwashers).
- It is the exclusive American importer of Belleek Fine Parian China and Aynsley Fine English Bone China Tableware.

The company's manufacturing complex in Taunton is listed on the National Register of Historic Places.

== Bankruptcy ==
Reed & Barton filed for Chapter 11 bankruptcy in February 2015, citing ongoing pension liabilities and decreasing revenue. In a bankruptcy auction conducted in April 2015, the operating assets of the company were acquired by The Lenox Company, a competing maker of flatware and tableware.

== Archives and records ==
- Reed & Barton Company records at Baker Library Special Collections, Harvard Business School.
- Reed & Barton virtual archive, maintained by the Old Colony History Museum
