= Taunton City Hall =

- U.S. Historic district – Contributing property
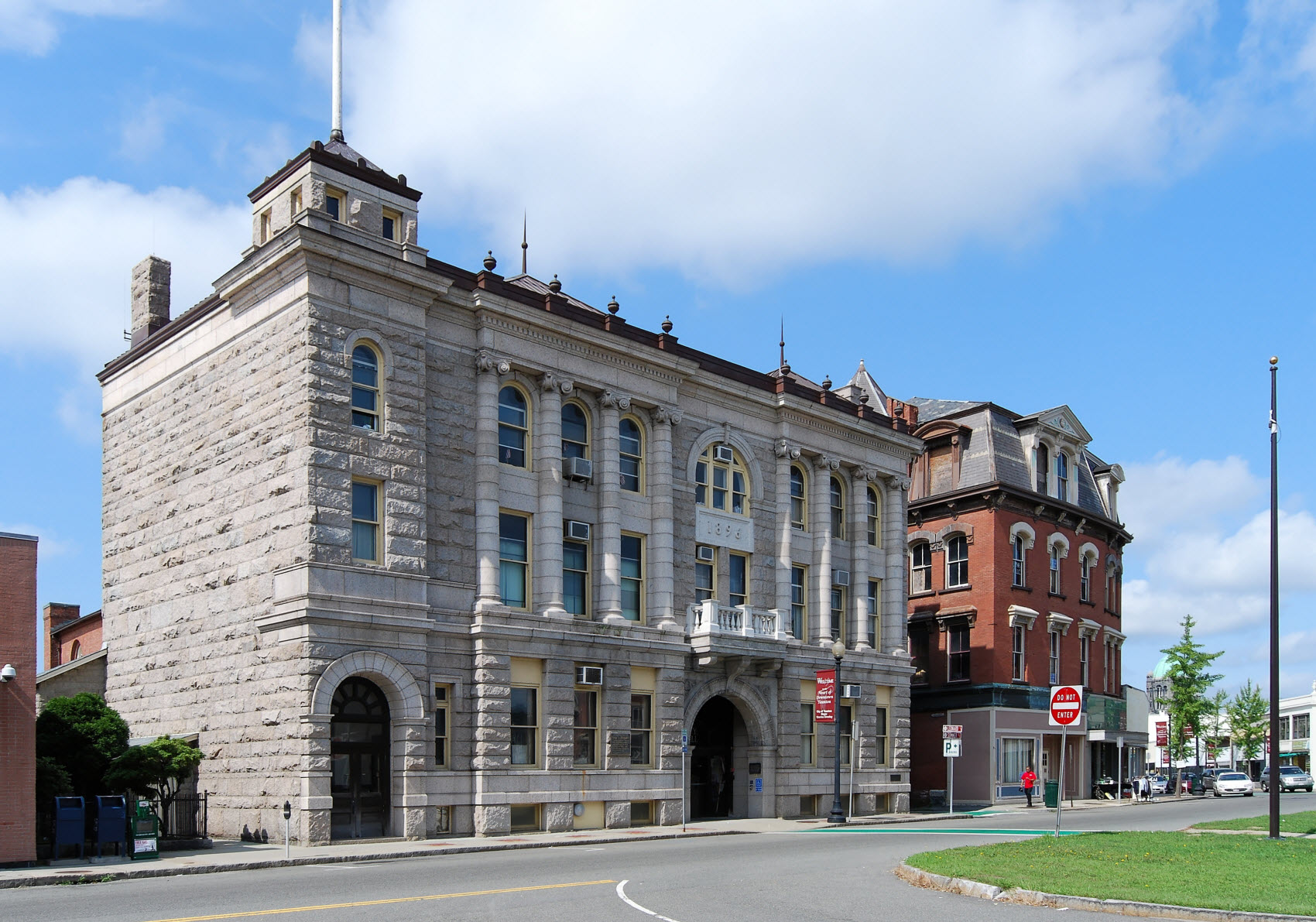
- Taunton City Hall (left) and the (now demolished) Star Theater/Leonard Block
- Location: Taunton, Massachusetts
- Coordinates: 41°54′4″N 71°5′22″W
- Built: 1848/1896
- Architect: Earl E. Ryder (1848); J. Merrill Brown (1896)
- Architectural style: Renaissance revival
- Part of: Church Green (Taunton, Massachusetts) (ID77000168)
- Added to NRHP: December 16, 1977

Taunton City Hall is an historic city hall containing the offices of the municipal government for the city of Taunton, Massachusetts, including the office of the mayor and the city council chambers. The building was originally constructed in 1848, and expanded in 1896. It is a contributing property to the Church Green national historic district, located at the intersection of U.S. Route 44 and State Route 140. An arson fire in 2010 caused severe damage and forced the building to stay closed for ten years.

== Historical notes ==
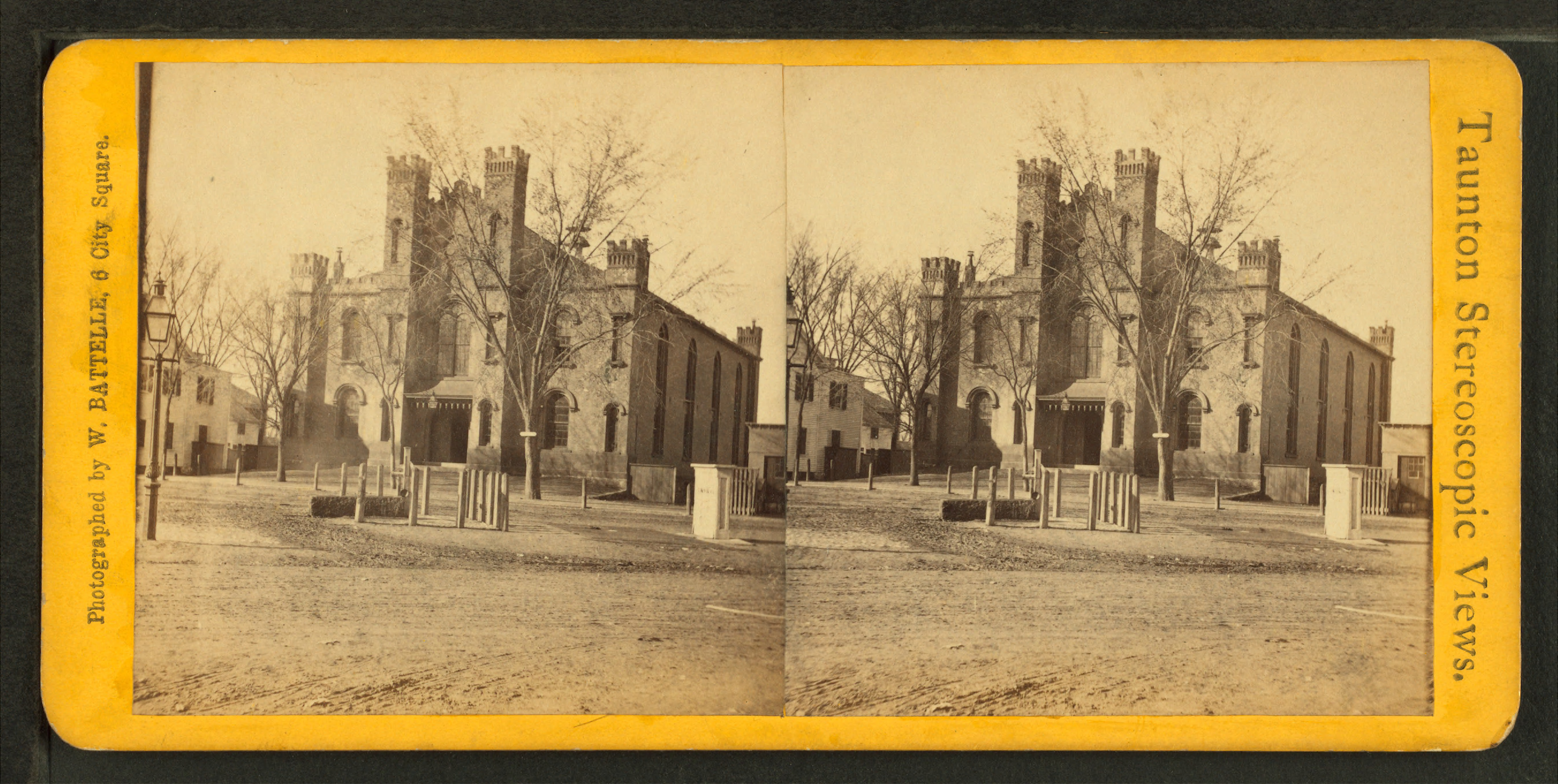
Taunton City Hall as it appeared before the expansion of 1896

The current city hall is located on land once owned by Marcus Morton, former governor of Massachusetts. Construction of the original building began in March 1848 and was completed in November of that same year. In 1853, a second story was added to the building. The original brick building was designed and built by Earl E. Ryder of Taunton.

Taunton High School was located in the second floor of city hall between 1854 and 1885.

In 1889, a memorial plaque listing the names of Tauntonians killed in action during the American Civil War was dedicated inside Taunton City Hall.

In July 1896 the original castle-like facade of city hall was removed, and replaced with a large granite addition designed in the Renaissance revival style by architect J. Merrill Brown at a cost of $45,000.

Taunton City Hall also contains memorial plaques to city victims of World War I and World War II.

=== 2010 arson fire ===
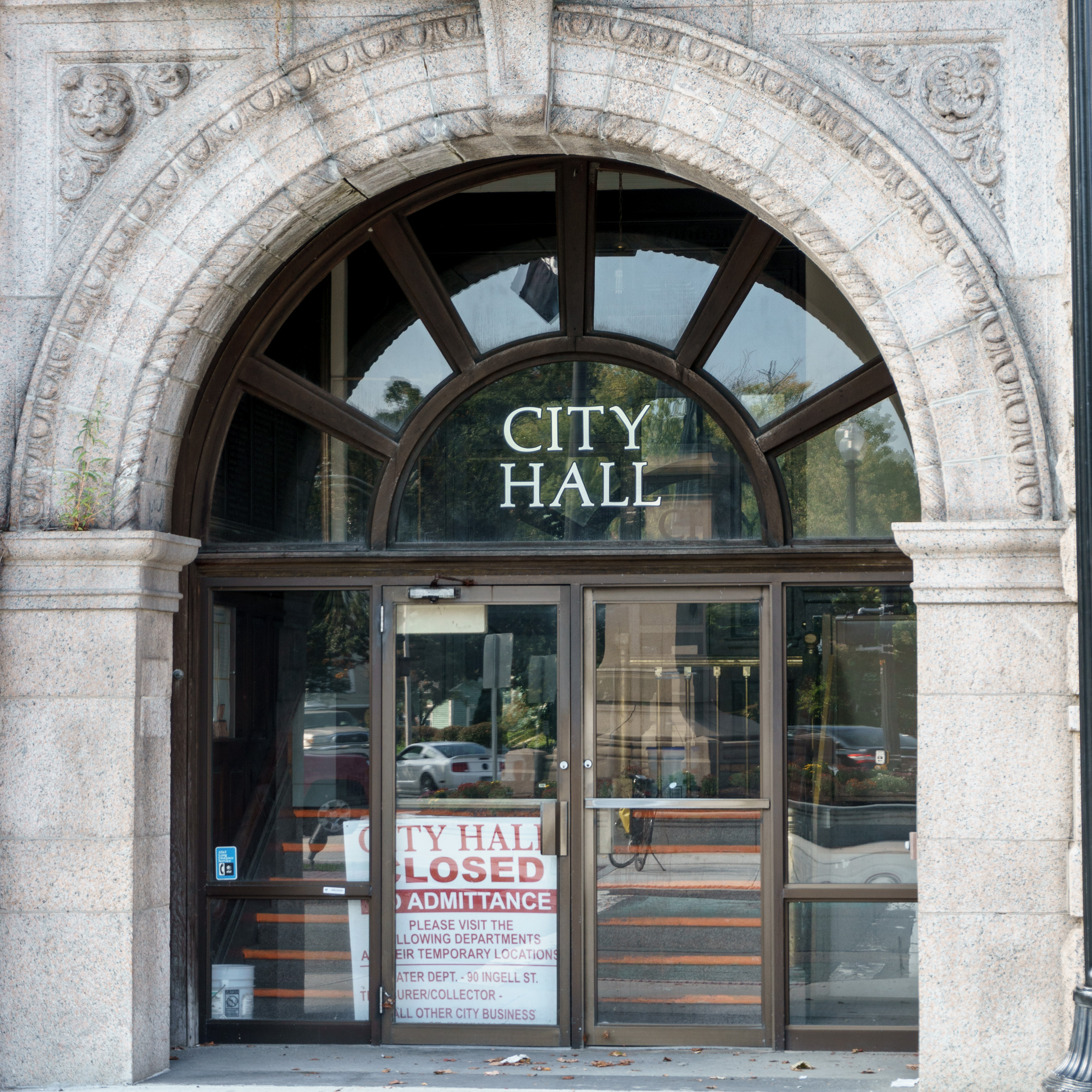
Closed in 2015 due to fire

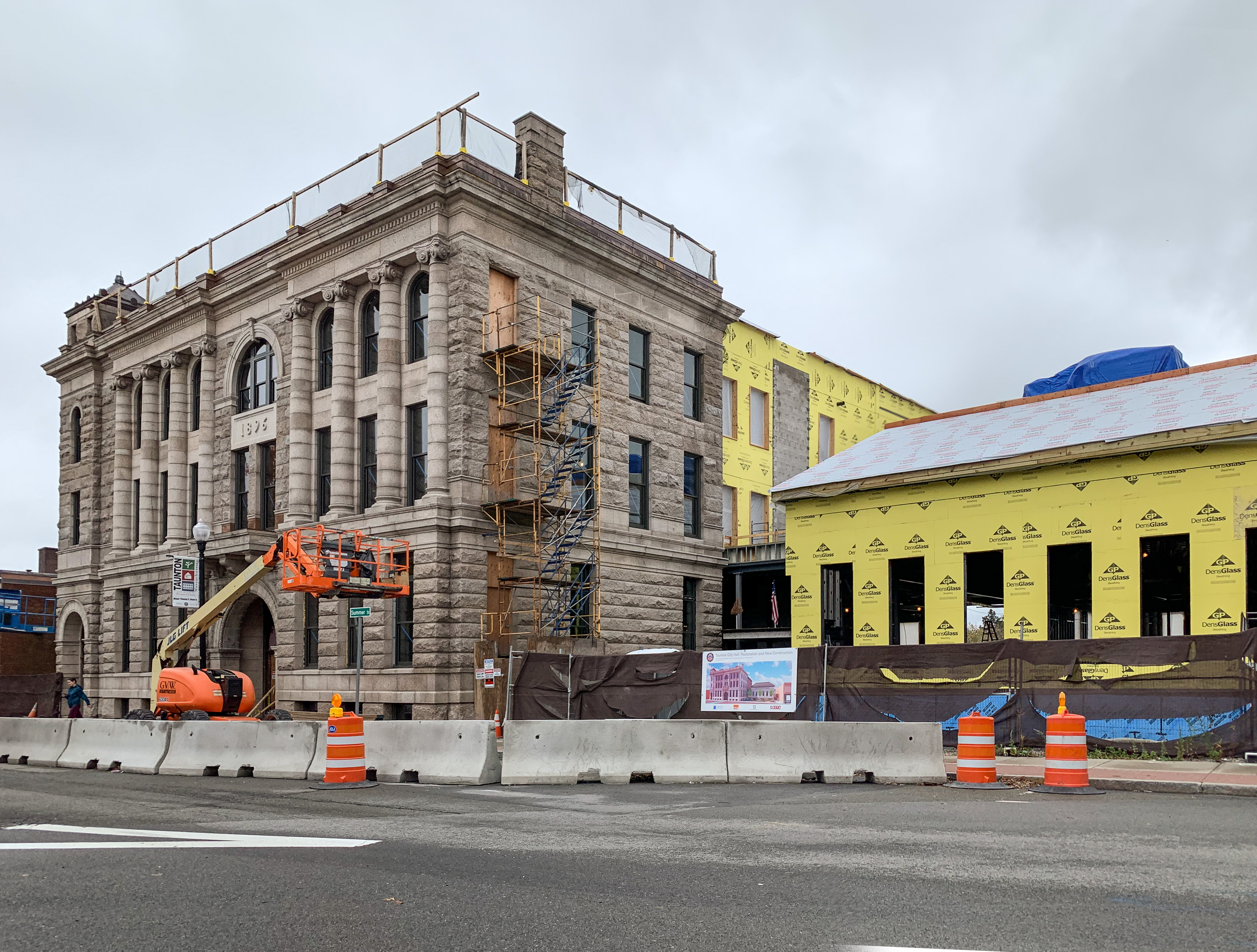
Addition under construction in 2019

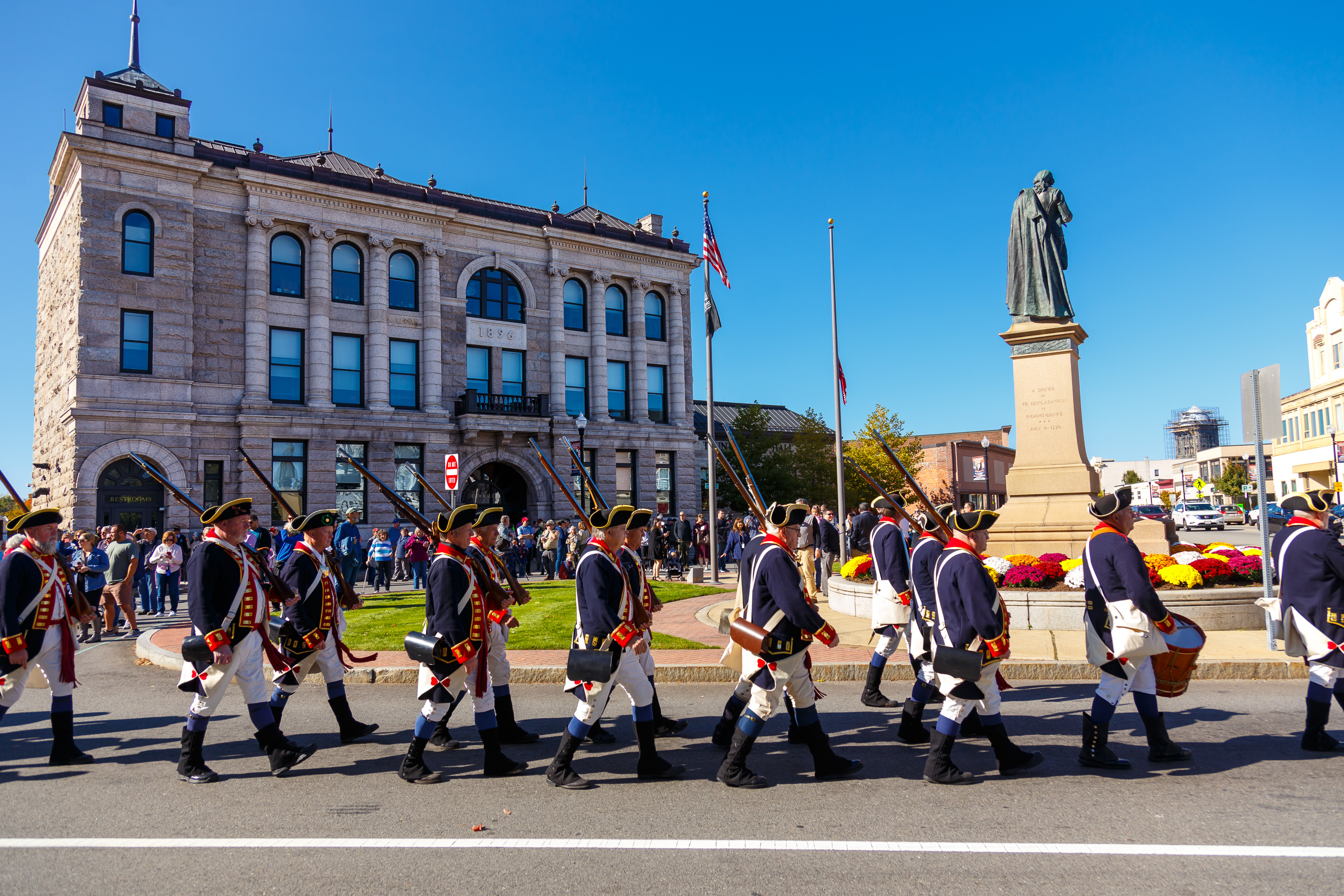
2024 Liberty & Union Day parade

On the morning of August 17, 2010, an arsonist broke into the fourth-floor attic and set the building ablaze. Efforts to put out the fire caused considerable water damage to saturated walls and ceilings, nearly all of which were later torn apart to prevent mold. Estimates to repair City Hall have ranged from $15 million to $23 million. City operations were moved temporarily to Oak Street, in what was the Lowell M. Maxham School. In December 2014, the Star Theater/Leonard Block building, adjacent to City Hall, was demolished, in hopes that the demolition would make it easier to repair City Hall.

=== Renovation and re-opening ===
A $27 million renovation of Taunton City Hall began in February 2019 and was completed in September 2020, ten years after the fire. The original 1846 main building was torn down due to poor condition, and the 1896 addition was saved and renovated. A new addition was built in place of the demolished 1846 section. Details like plaques, fireplaces, and old vault doors were retained. Taunton City Hall reopened its doors in October 2020.

== See also ==
- National Register of Historic Places listings in Taunton, Massachusetts
- Old Colony Historical Society
- First Parish Church (Taunton, Massachusetts)
