= Union Mission Chapel-Historical Hall =

- U.S. National Register of Historic Places
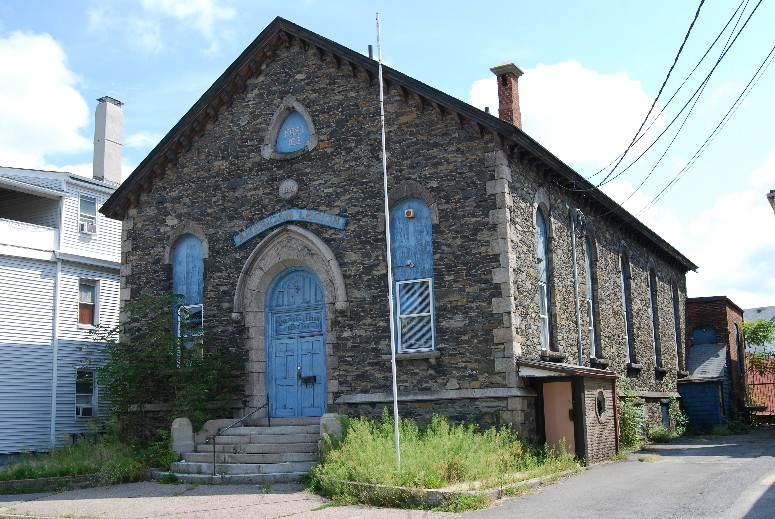

- Location within Massachusetts Location within the United States
- Location: Taunton, Massachusetts
- Coordinates: 41°54′13″N 71°5′30″W
- Built: 1867
- Architectural style: Late Gothic Revival
- MPS: Taunton MRA
- NRHP reference No.: 84002235
- Added to NRHP: July 5, 1984

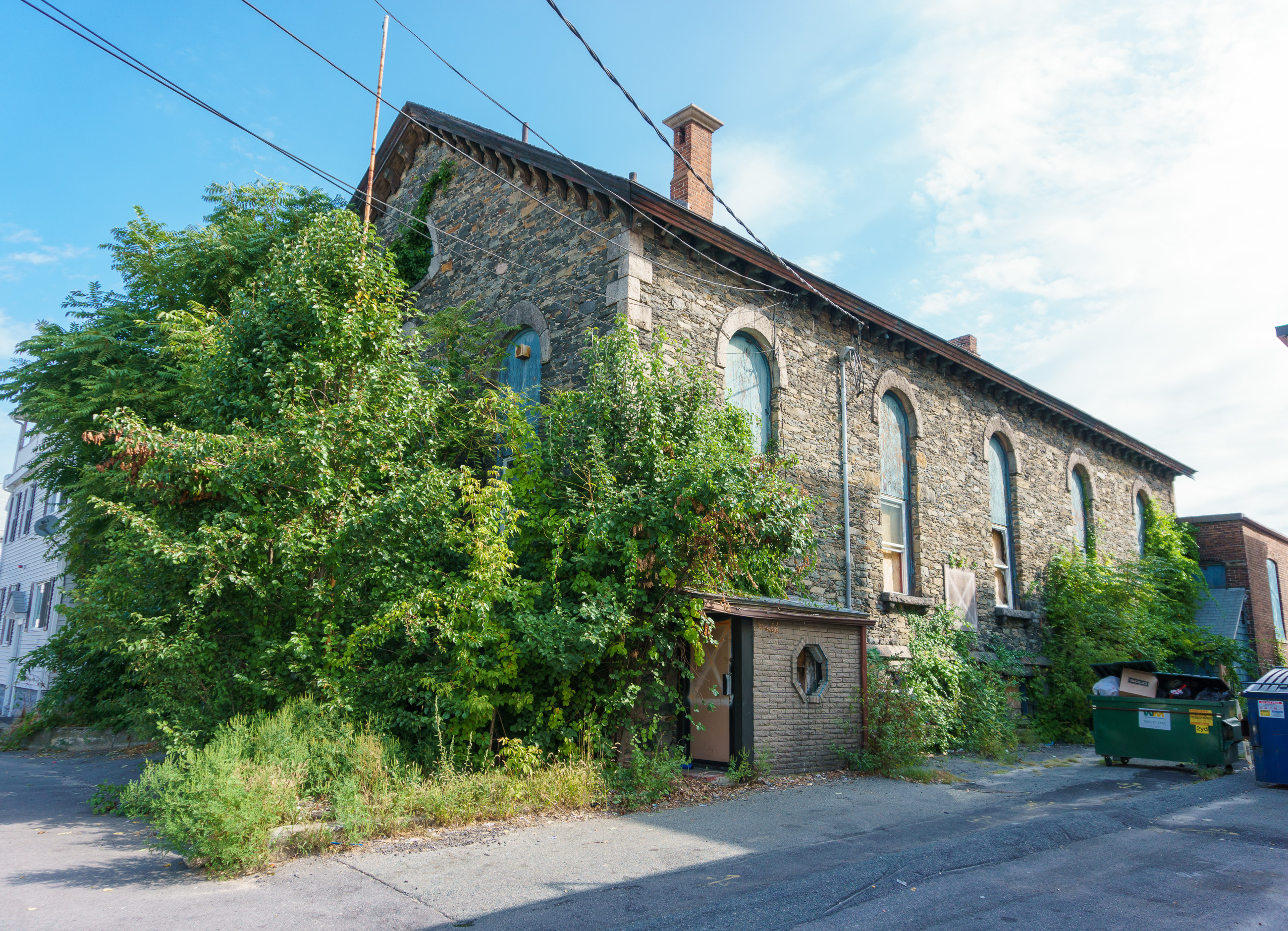
The building shows signs of neglect in September 2015.

The Union Mission Chapel-Historical Hall is an historic building at 5 Cedar Street in Taunton, Massachusetts. Built as a chapel in 1867, it has also served as a mission hall and museum, and housed the local American Legion chapter for many years beginning in 1926. The building, one of the few stone structures in the city, was added to the National Register of Historic Places in 1984.

== Description and history ==
The former Union Mission Chapel building is located on the east side of Cedar Street in downtown Taunton, just north of Main Street. It is a single-story fieldstone structure, with a front-facing gable roof. Windows are set in round arches capped with limestone trim, and the front (west-facing) entrance is set in a round-arch recess under a Gothic-arched limestone hood. The building corners are trimmed with limestone quoin blocks, and the cornice is lined with modillions.

The chapel was built in 1867, underwritten by Joseph Dean, a local businessman who sought to provide a place of worship for people who could not afford to purchase pews at the First Congregational Church. In 1881 the building was repurposed as a mission hall by an organization providing assistance to the needy. In 1886 it was sold to the Old Colony Historical Society, which occupied the building until 1926, using it as a meeting hall and artifact repository. For many years the building was home to the local chapter of the American Legion. it has stood vacant since at least 2009.

== See also ==
- National Register of Historic Places listings in Taunton, Massachusetts
