= First Parish Church (Dover, New Hampshire) =

Historic church in New Hampshire, United States

- U.S. National Register of Historic Places
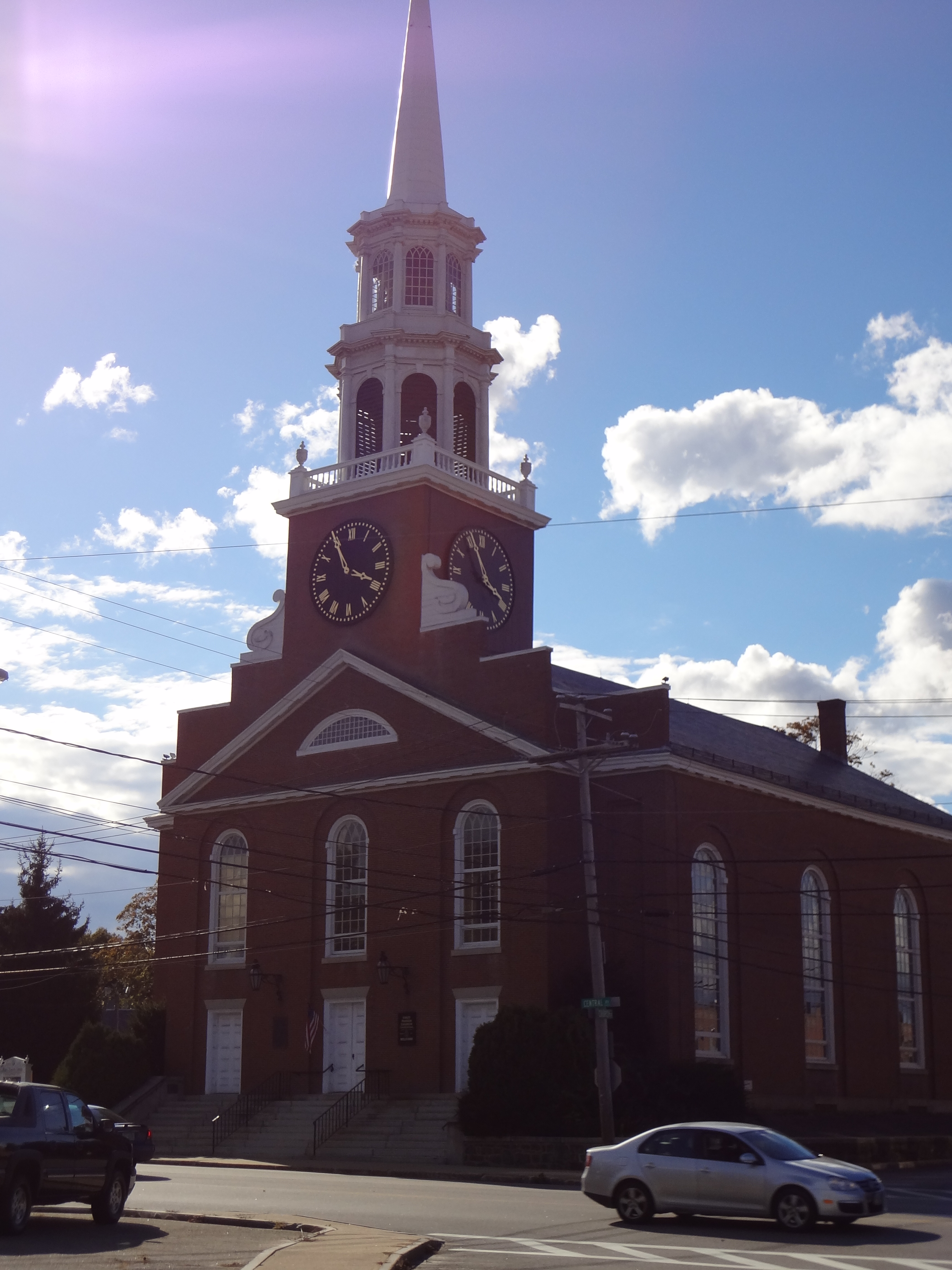

- Location within New Hampshire Location within the United States
- Location: 218 Central Ave., Dover, New Hampshire
- Coordinates: 43°11′28″N 70°52′26″W
- Area: 0.5 acres (0.20 ha)
- Built: 1825
- Architect: Davis, Capt. James
- Architectural style: Federal
- NRHP reference No.: 82001696
- Added to NRHP: March 11, 1982

The First Parish Church is a historic church at 218 Central Avenue in Dover, New Hampshire. The church was designed and built by Captain James Davis in 1825, inspired by the Federal style designs of Charles Bulfinch, Asher Benjamin, and Alexander Parris. It is the fifth home to a parish that was first gathered in 1633 at Dover Point. The church was added to the National Register of Historic Places in 1982. The congregation is affiliated with the United Church of Christ.

== Description and history ==
Dover's First Parish Church is located at the southern end of Dover's commercial downtown area, on the west side of Central Avenue (New Hampshire Route 9) at its junction with Church Street. It is a tall single-story masonry structure, built with load-bearing brick walls and a gabled roof with a stepped gable end at the front. A broad three-bay section projects from the front facade, with a fully pedimented gable and stepped gable parapet with a heavy baroque volute ornament adjacent to the tower base. The tower rises, its front face flush with the projection, to include a square clock stage and an open octagonal belfry topped by a lantern stage and steeple. Window bays are tall and topped by rounded arches. The front facade has three entrances, each topped by a stone lintel. The interior has a mid-to-late 19th-century appearance, with slip pews.

The church was built in 1825 by James Davis, a local master joiner. Its design is based on the original appearance of St. John's Church in Portsmouth, which was a design of Alexander Parris and also originally featured the volutes found here. The Portsmouth church's design is in turn based on the works of Charles Bulfinch. This church's steeple is based on another church, located in Newburyport, Massachusetts.

The church congregation, founded in 1633 at Dover Point, is the oldest in the state of New Hampshire. The site of its second church, built in 1654, is also listed on the National Register.

== See also ==
- National Register of Historic Places listings in Strafford County, New Hampshire
