= Church Green (Taunton, Massachusetts) =

- U.S. National Register of Historic Places
- U.S. Historic district
- Vietnam Memorial Fountain on Church Green with Vietnam Memorial and Global War on Terrorism Memorial

- Location within Massachusetts Location within the United States
- Location: Taunton, Massachusetts
- Coordinates: 41°54′5″N 71°5′17″W
- Architect: Multiple
- Architectural style: Late Victorian, Renaissance, Gothic Revival
- NRHP reference No.: 77000168
- Added to NRHP: December 16, 1977

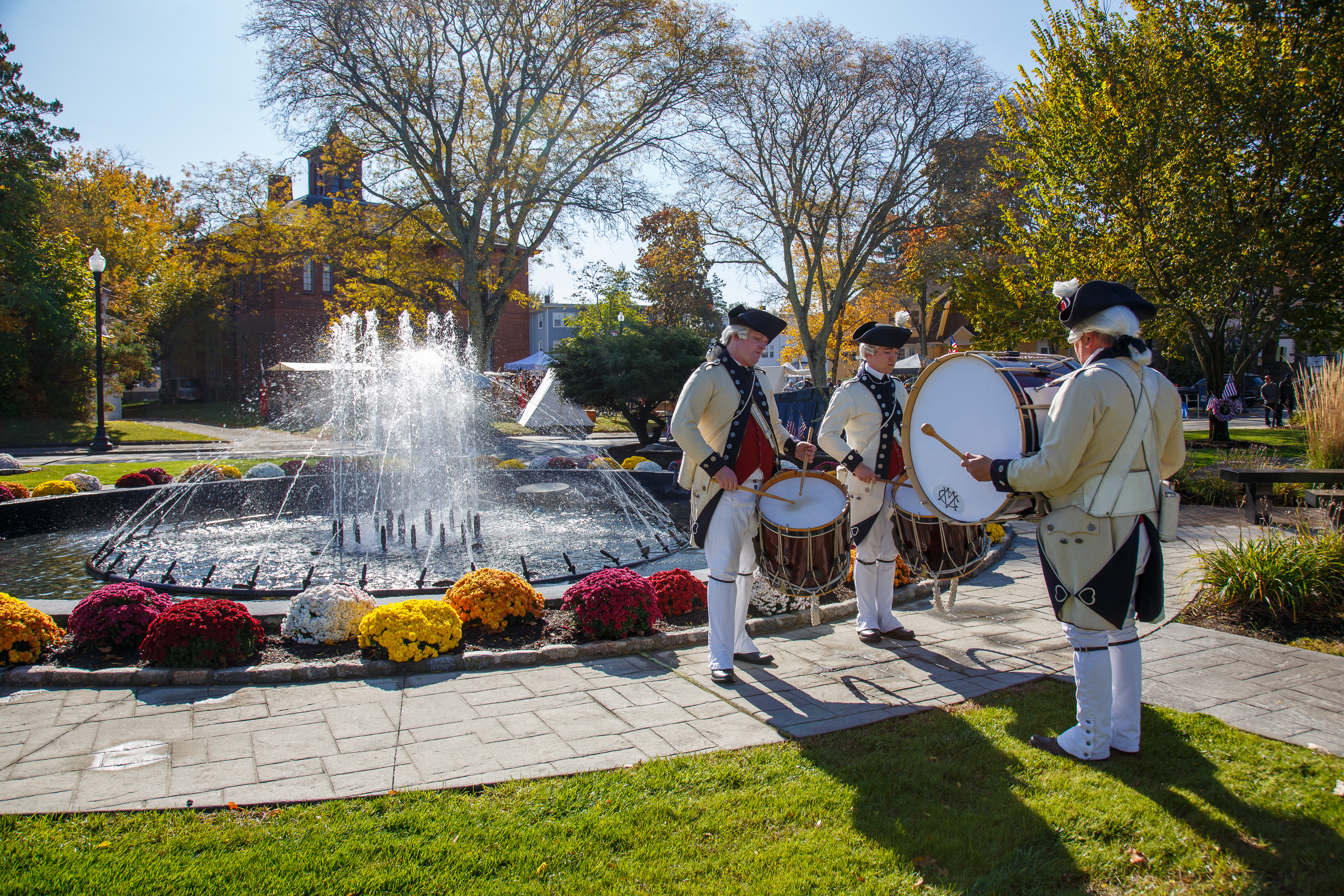
Liberty & Union Day at Church Green

The Church Green is a town common in Taunton, Massachusetts. It is a triangular-shaped parcel of land located at the intersection of Summer Street (Route 140) and Dean Street (Route 44). It has distinctive Veterans Memorials dedicated to both Vietnam veterans and global war on terrorism veterans. These memorials feature seven flags that are in a V shape, a fountain, a brick garden, reflection benches, the Vietnam Veterans Memorial and the Global War on Terrorism Memorial.

The green was added to the National Register of Historic Places in 1977, as part of a district which includes the First Parish Church, the Old Colony Historical Society, Taunton City Hall, and several other historic homes and commercial buildings.

The Church Green National Historic District overlaps the local Taunton Historic District, administered by the Taunton Historic District Commission.

== History ==
Originally known as Meetinghouse Common, Church Green is the site of Taunton's first town center, and the location of its first meetinghouse (ca. 1647), used for both religious and governmental purposes.

On November 13, 2011, The City of Taunton, MA raised seven new flag poles. The flags form a V on the point of Church Green, with the American Flag in the center, each flag pole has the distinctive flag for each branch of the United States Military. The flags were raised as phase 1 of the Taunton Global War on Terrorism Memorial. On June 10, 2012, The City of Taunton dedicated the Taunton Global War on Terrorism Memorial on Church Green.

== Properties ==
Non-residential

- First Parish Church (1830)
- Taunton City Hall (1848 & 1896)
- Morton Block (c.1840)
- Old Colony Historical Society/Bristol Academy (1852)
- Leonard Block (1870, demolished 2014)
- Winthrop Club (c.1900)
- Robert Treat Paine Statue (1904)
- Vietnam Memorial Fountain (1968)
- Global War on Terrorism Memorial (2012)

Residential

- Anselm Bassett House (1825)
- Carleton Brabrook House (c.1873)
- George Crocker House (1858)
- Barney Deane House (c.1829)
- Charles Foster House (c.1845)
- Charles T. Hubbard House (1884)
- Charles T. Newbury House (1905)
- Maurice Mason House (c.1902)
- Abner Pitts House (1836)
- Frank Smeardon House (1919)
- Richard Warner House (1919)
- Alfred B. Williams House (1899)

Non-contributing property

- 31 Church Green (1970), modern apartment building
Church Green Fountain

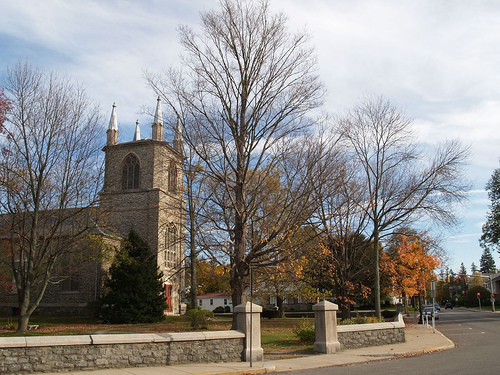
First Parish Church

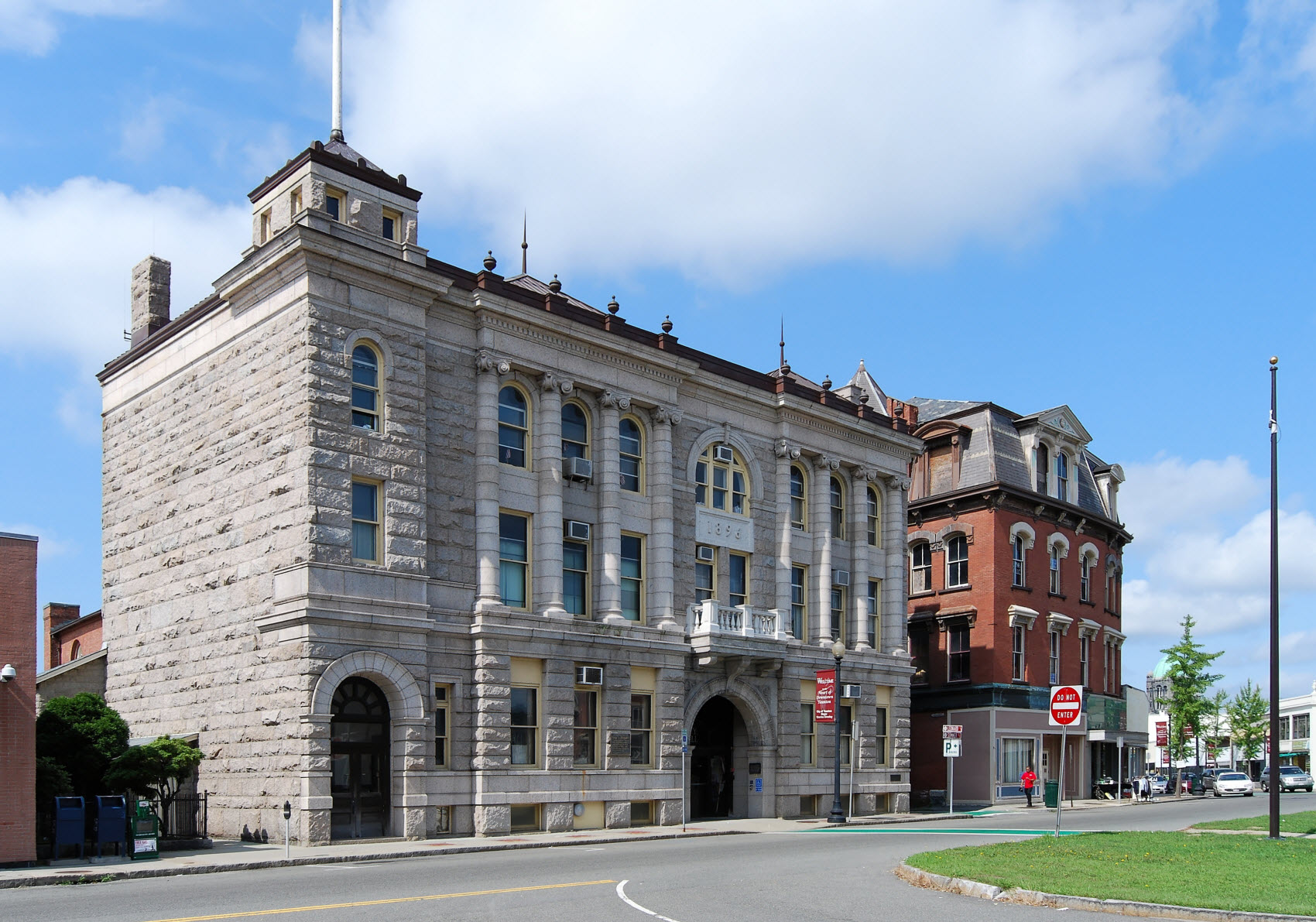
City Hall and Leonard Block

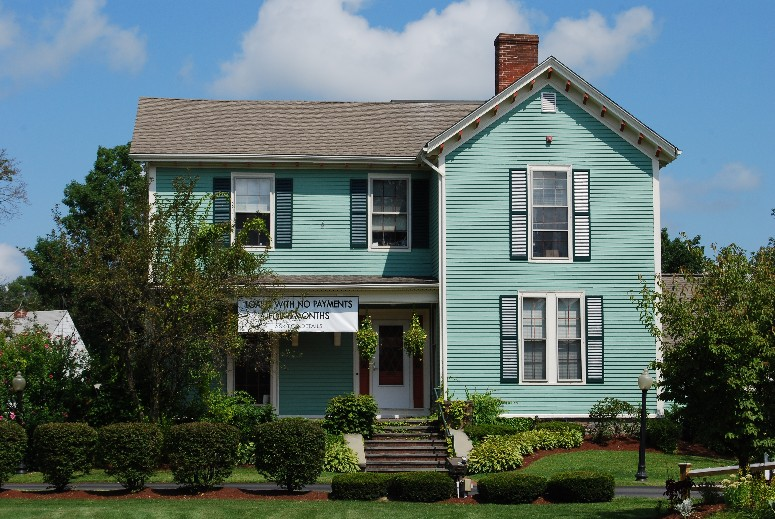
Charles T. Hubbard House

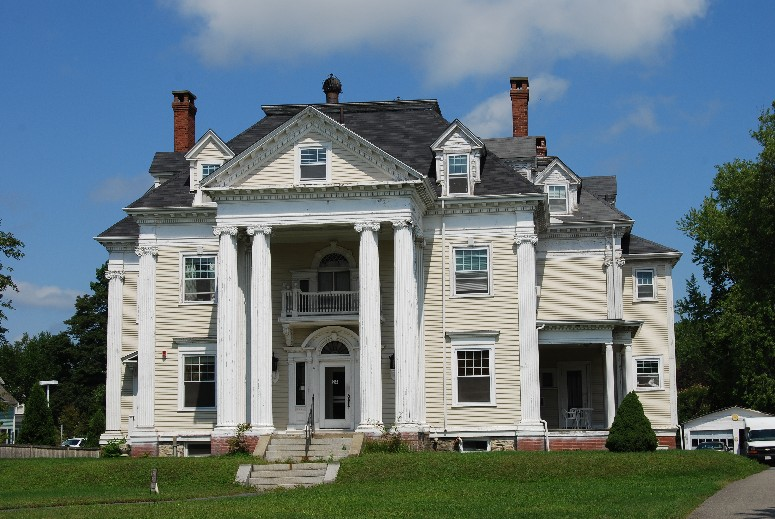
Charles T. Newbury House

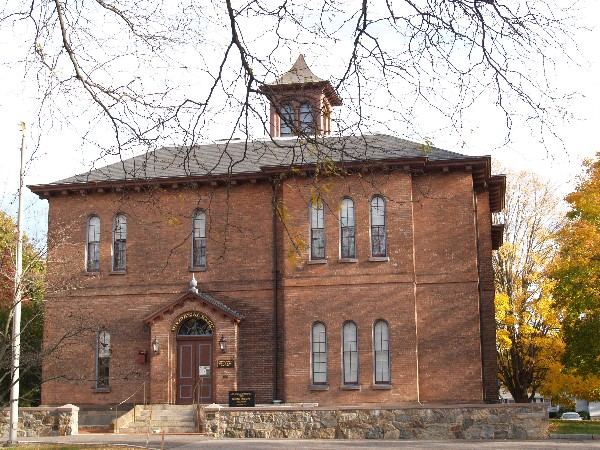
Old Colony Historical Society

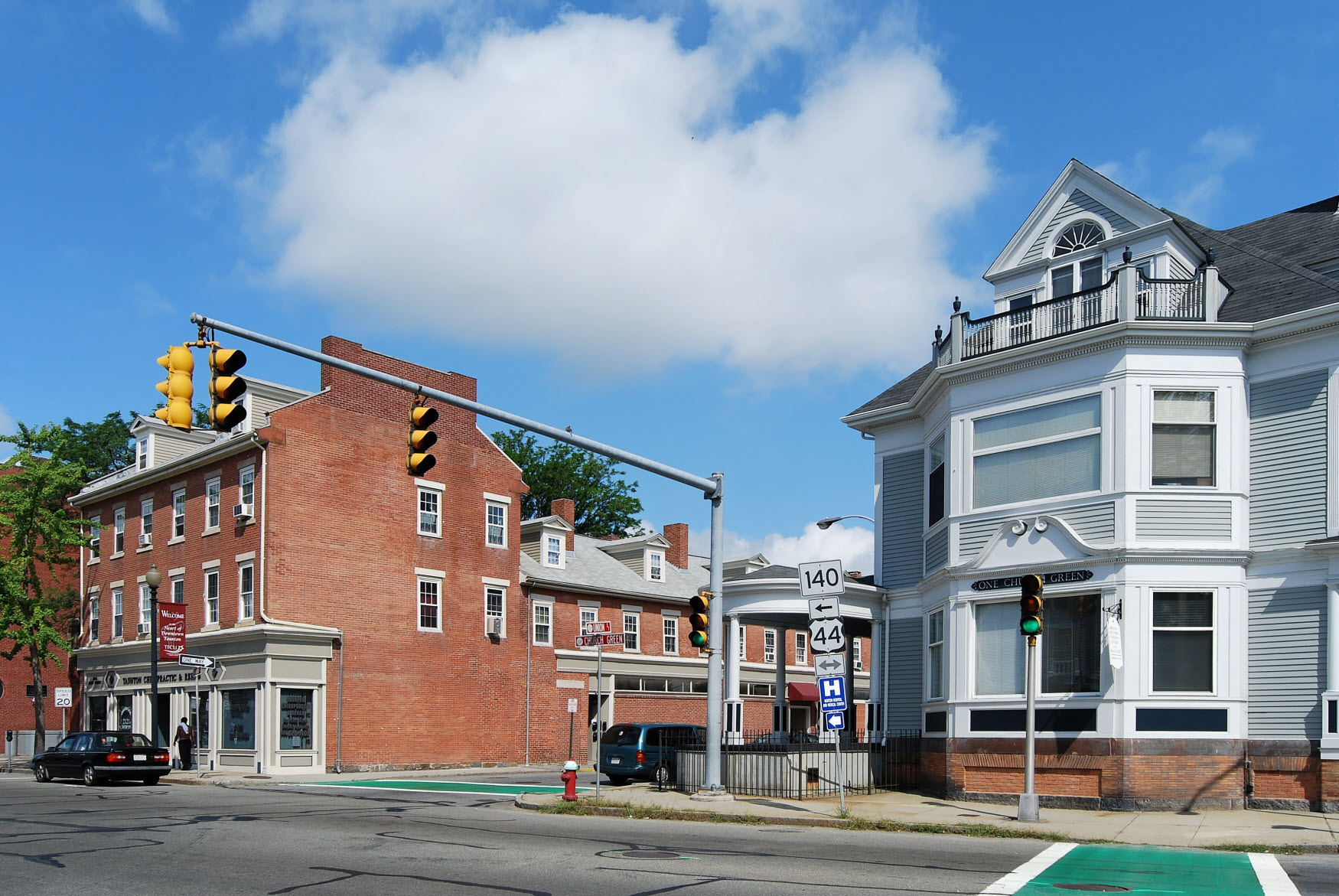
Winthrop Club and Morton Block

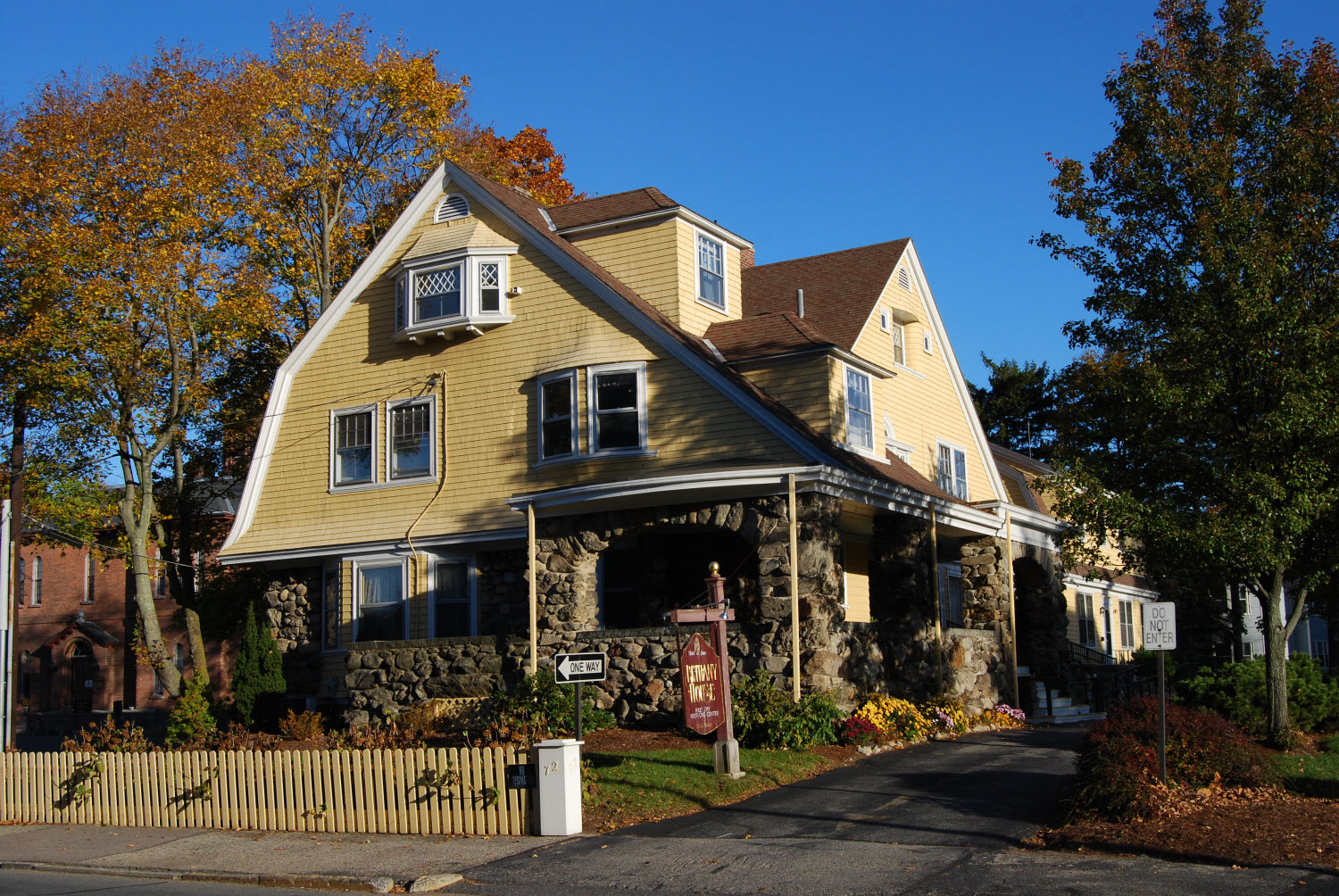
Maurice Mason House

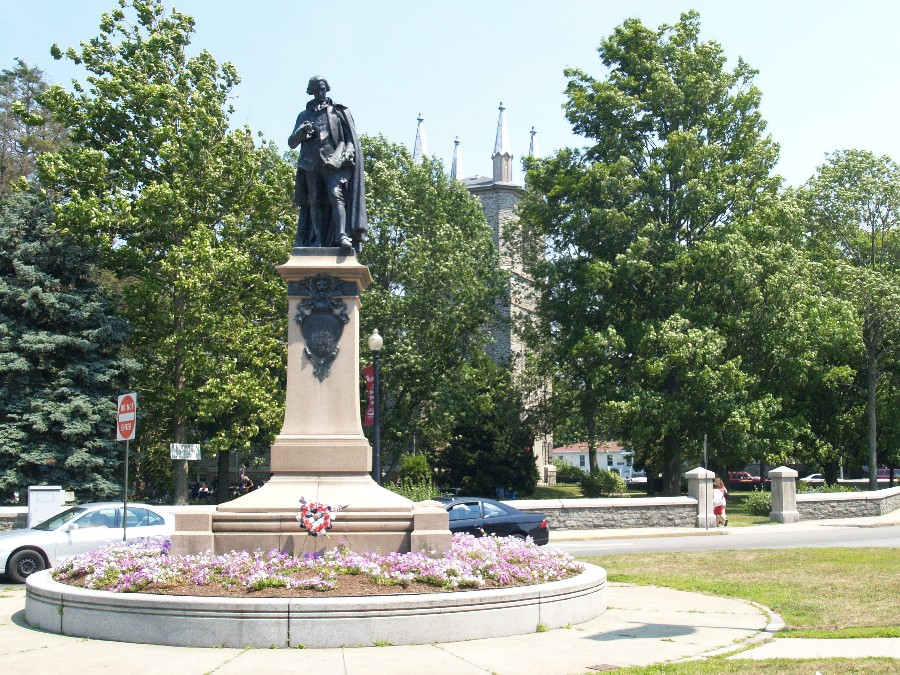
Robert Treat Paine Statue

== See also ==
- National Register of Historic Places listings in Taunton, Massachusetts
- Taunton Green Historic District
