= Pilgrim Congregational Church (Taunton, Massachusetts) =

Historic church in Massachusetts, United States

- U.S. National Register of Historic Places
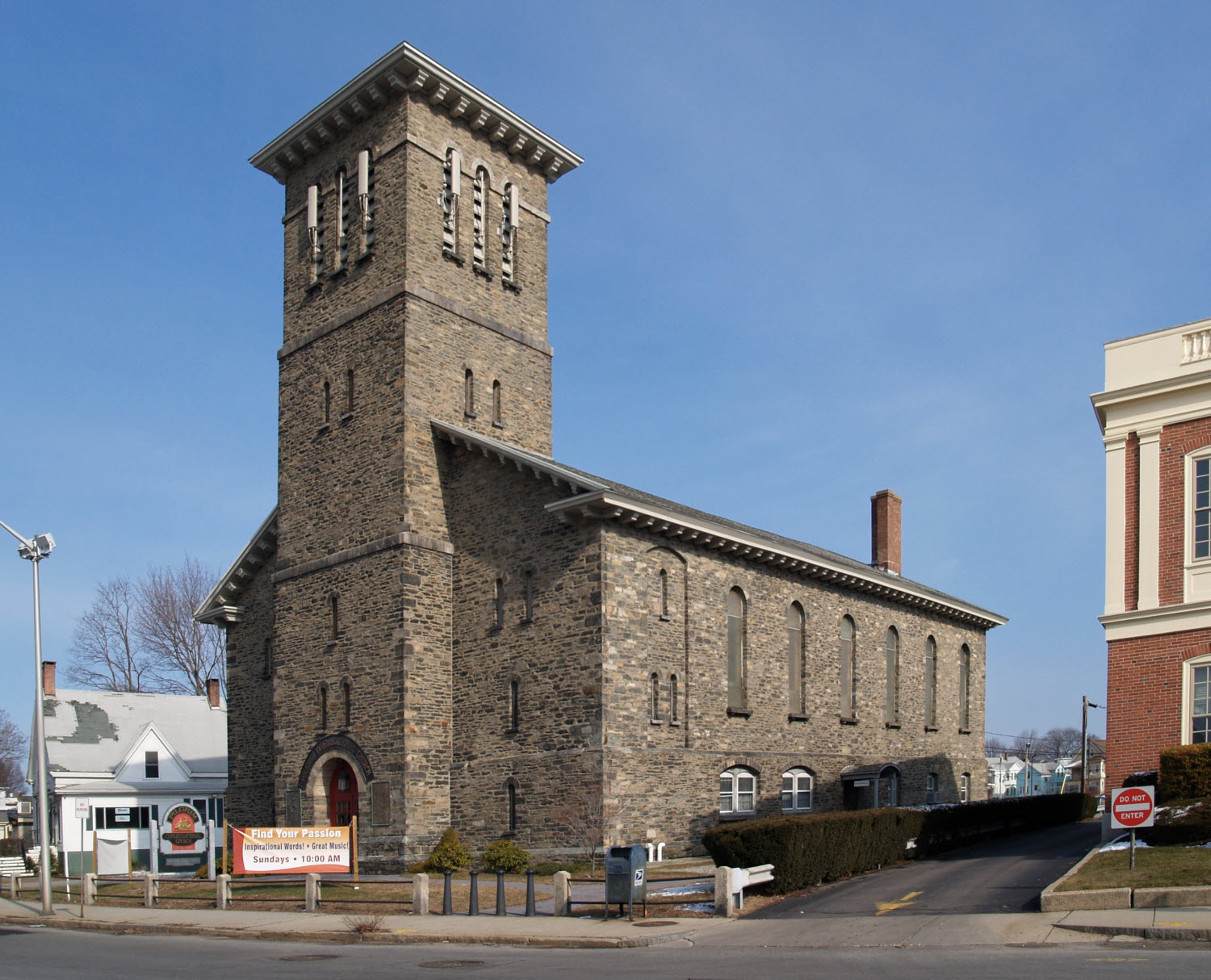

- Location within Massachusetts Location within the United States
- Location: Taunton, Massachusetts
- Coordinates: 41°54′14″N 71°5′36″W
- Built: 1852
- Architect: Richard Upjohn
- Architectural style: Romanesque
- MPS: Taunton MRA
- NRHP reference No.: 84002199
- Added to NRHP: July 5, 1984

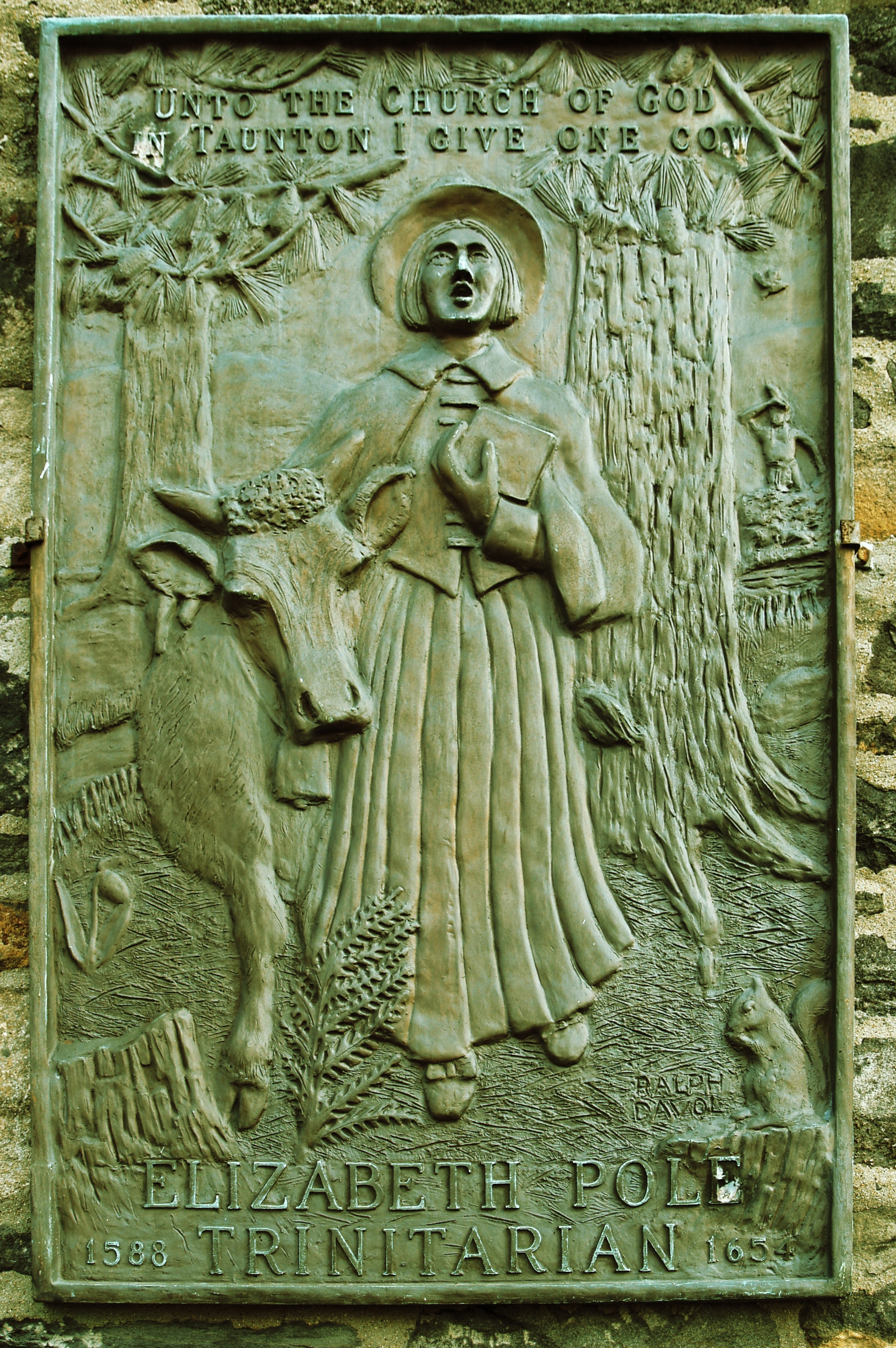
Plaque on the front of the church

Pilgrim Congregational Church is an historic Congregational Church at 45 Broadway in Taunton, Massachusetts. The Ronamesque stone church was designed by architect Richard Upjohn and built in 1852. The congregation was established by a doctrinal division of the First Parish Church. The church was listed on the National Register of Historic Places on July 5, 1984.

== Description and history ==
The Pilgrim Congregational Church is located on the east side of Broadway, a short way north of Taunton Green. It is a fieldstone structure, with a broad gabled roof and a slightly projecting square tower that divides the front (west-facing) facade into three parts. The main entrance is at the base of the tower, recessed under a round-arched opening. Windows on the front facade and tower are narrow Gothic arched windows up to the tower's belfry, which has three tall round-arch louvered openings on each face. The tower is capped by a low-pitch pyramidal roof with heavy brackets. Windows in the side walls are large round-arch stained glass windows, except in the first bay, where a recessed panel houses three small windows similar to those on the front. To the rear of the main church is a small chapel, added in 1915.

The church was designed by the architect Richard Upjohn and built in 1852 for a congregation established in 1823, which originally met in a wood-frame structure located just north of this building's site. It is the second-oldest church building in central Taunton.

== See also ==
- National Register of Historic Places listings in Taunton, Massachusetts
