= First Parish Unitarian Universalist Church of Scituate =

Church in Massachusetts, United States

Coordinates: 42°12′01″N 70°45′20″W

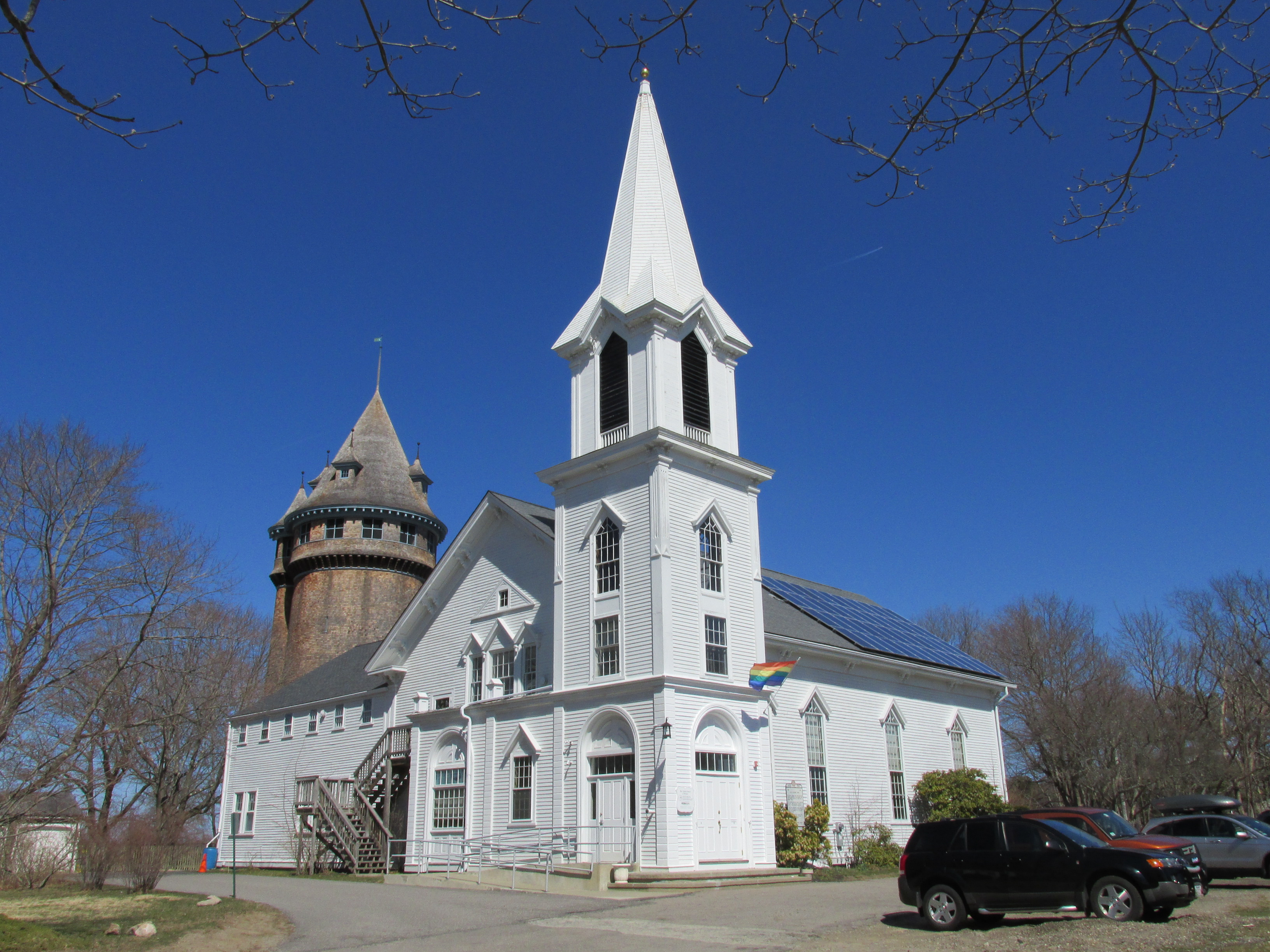
First Parish Church and the Lawson Tower

The First Parish Church of Scituate, Massachusetts, is a historic congregation in Plymouth County, Massachusetts that was founded in 1616 in England. The congregation thus is almost 400 years old. Disagreements over baptism, the belief in the Trinity, and other issues within the church led to three groups splitting off to form new churches during a 60-year period.

It has a historic building dating from 1881.

Its church is located next to another Scituate landmark, the Lawson Tower.
