= First Parish Unitarian Church =

Historic church in Massachusetts, United States

- U.S. National Register of Historic Places
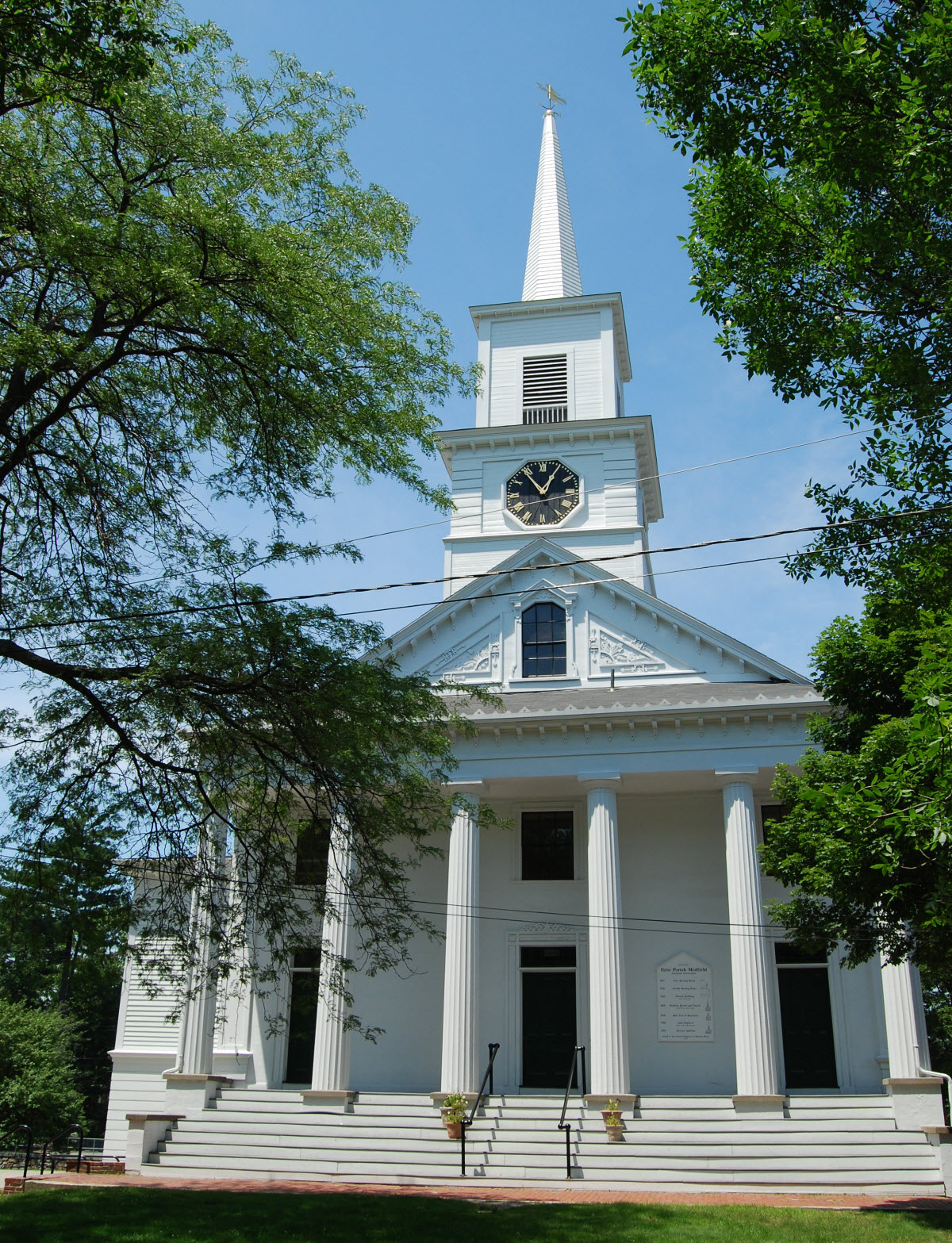

- Location within Massachusetts Location within the United States
- Location: Medfield, Massachusetts
- Coordinates: 42°11′14″N 71°18′25″W
- Built: 1789
- Architect: Bacon, Captain Joseph
- Architectural style: Greek Revival
- NRHP reference No.: 74000376
- Added to NRHP: April 18, 1974

The First Parish Unitarian Church, now the First Parish Unitarian Universalist Church of Medfield, is a historic church on North Street in Medfield, Massachusetts. The white clapboarded church was built in 1789, as the third for a congregation established c. 1652. In 1839 it was rotated on its site ninety degrees. It lost its steeple in the New England Hurricane of 1938. The steeple was replaced in 1988, and the building's many layers of paint were stripped off in 2007.

The building was listed on the National Register of Historic Places in 1974.

== See also ==
- National Register of Historic Places listings in Norfolk County, Massachusetts
