= Old Colony History Museum =

- U.S. Historic district – Contributing property
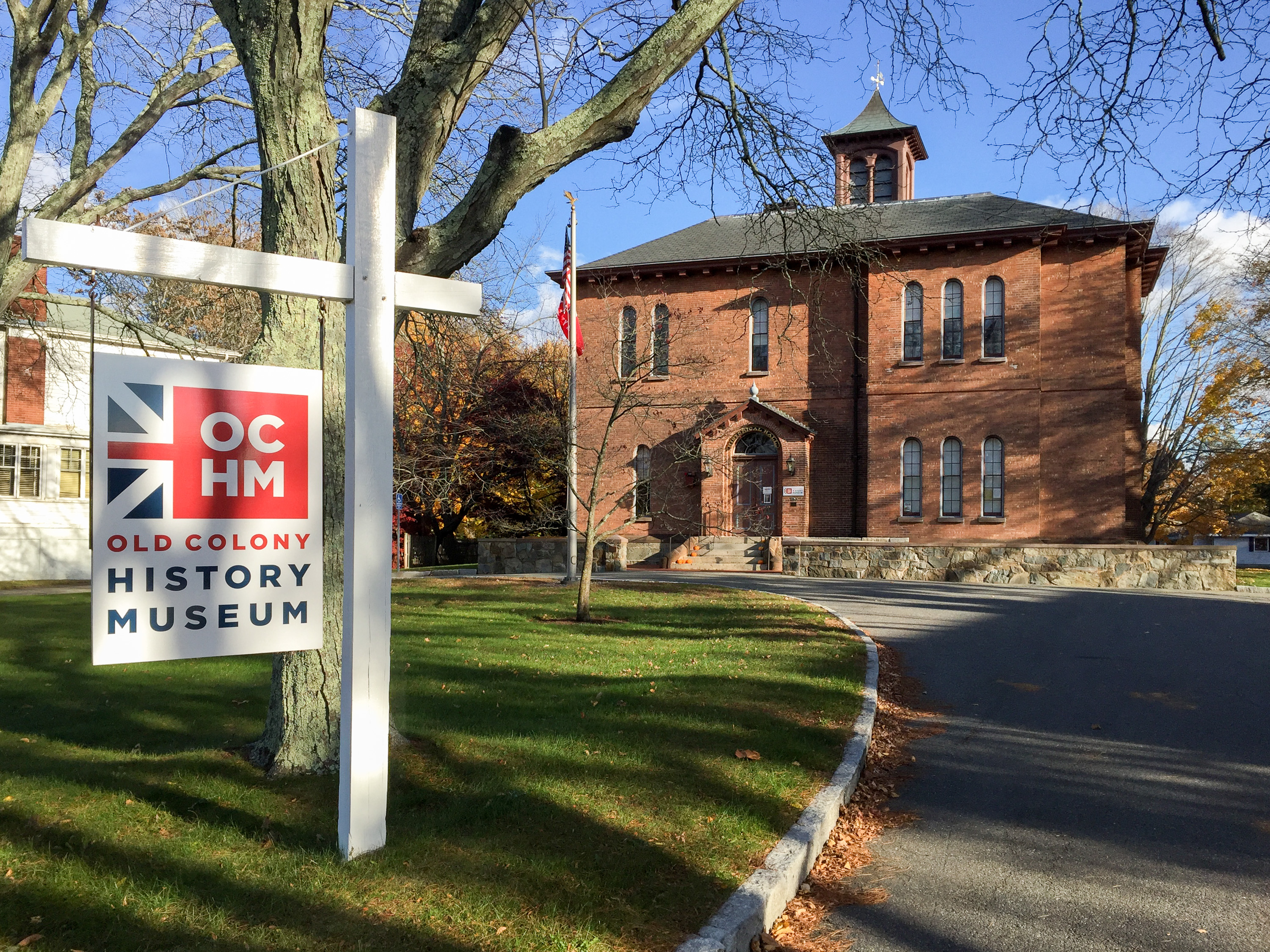
- Old Colony History Museum, building originally known as Bristol Academy
- Location: Taunton, Massachusetts
- Coordinates: 41°54′4″N 71°5′13″W
- Built: 1852
- Architect: Richard Upjohn
- Architectural style: Italianate
- Part of: Church Green (ID77000168)
- Added to NRHP: December 16, 1977

The Old Colony History Museum (OCHM) is located at 66 Church Green in Taunton, Bristol County, Massachusetts, United States. Since 1926, the museum has occupied the historic former Bristol Academy school building. The building was designed in 1852 by Richard Upjohn, architect of New York City's Trinity Church, and is listed on the National Register of Historic Places as part of the Church Green Historic District. The museum was previously located in the former Union Mission Chapel on Cedar Street.

== Collections ==
The Old Colony History Museum is home to an extensive collection of regional objects and archives and a research library specializing in local history and genealogy. Its parent organization, the Old Colony Historical Society, was founded on May 4, 1853, making it one of New England's oldest historical societies.

The organization maintains a research library specializing in the genealogy of Southeastern Massachusetts and local history, a museum of objects associated with the history of the Taunton area, and educational programs that are open to the public.

The museum maintains an online archive of materials relating to Taunton manufacturer Reed & Barton.

== Events ==
Each autumn, the Museum holds a Liberty and Union Festival to commemorate the events of October 1774, and to celebrate the Taunton Flag. The 250th anniversary of the flag raising was observed in October 2024.

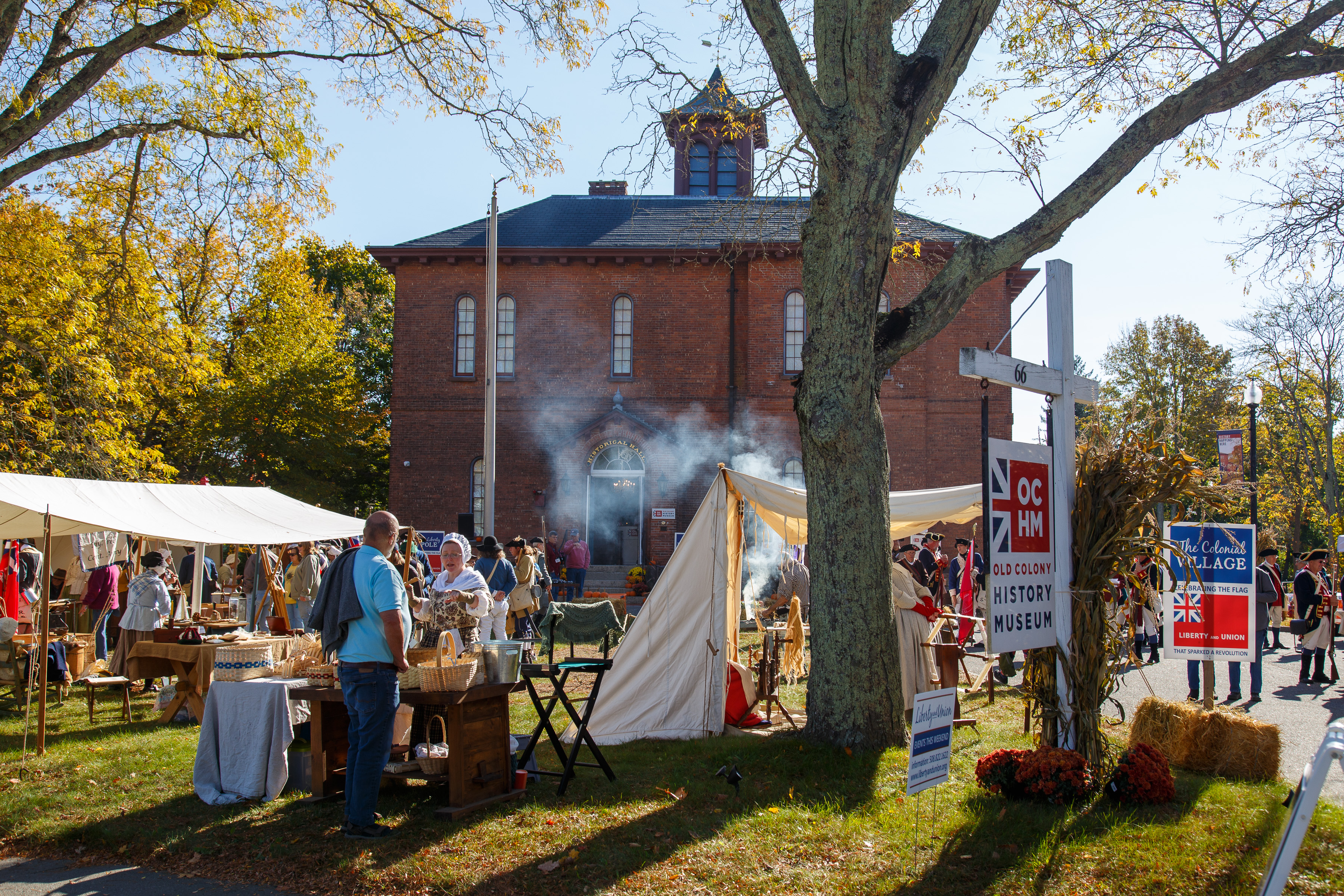
2024's Liberty & Union Day commemorated the 250th anniversary of the Taunton Flag

== See also ==
- First Parish Church (Taunton, Massachusetts)
- Taunton City Hall
- National Register of Historic Places listings in Taunton, Massachusetts
- Plymouth Colony
