= First Parish Church Site-Dover Point =

Historic church in New Hampshire, United States

- U.S. National Register of Historic Places
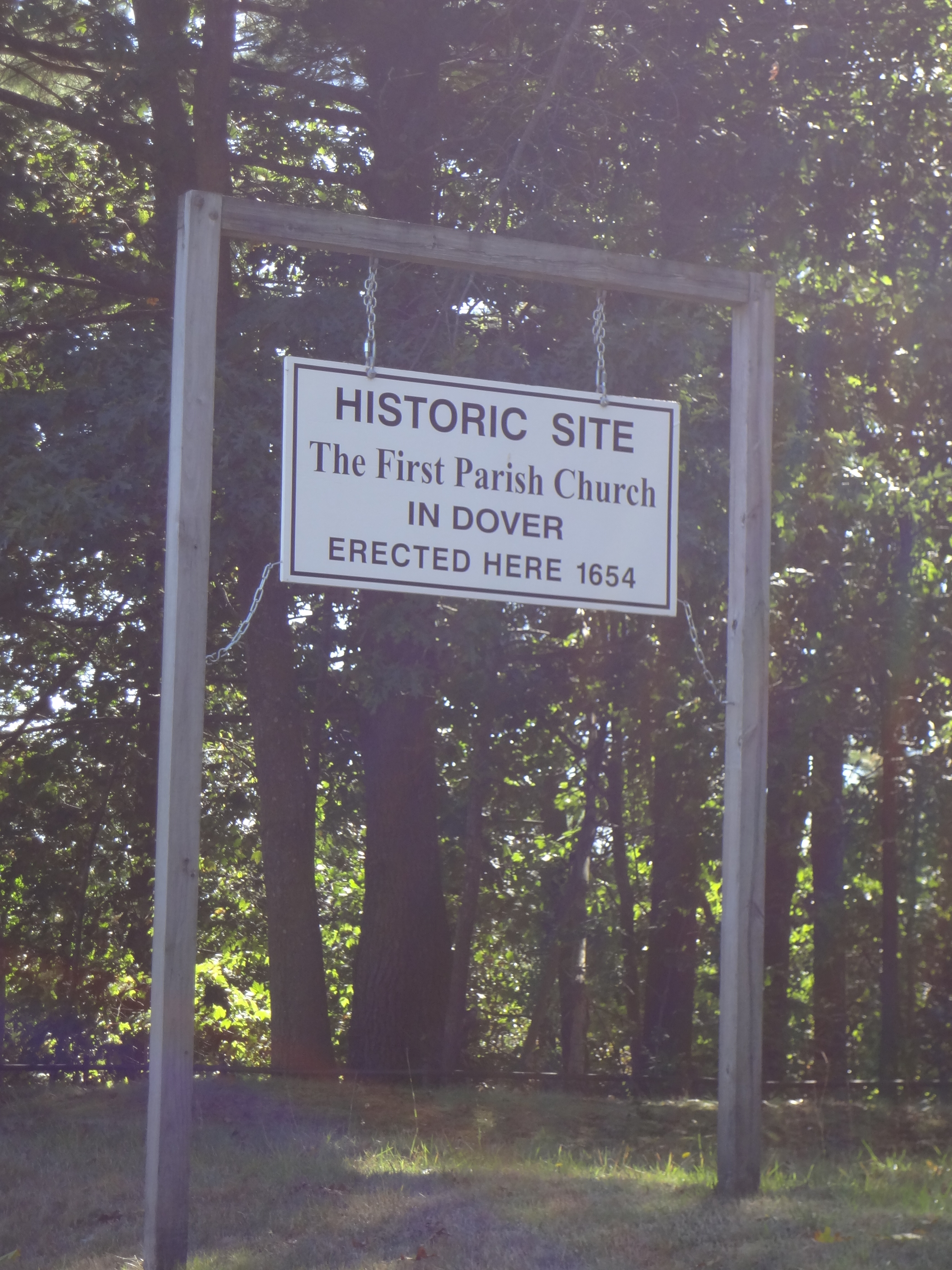

- Location within New Hampshire Location within the United States
- Location: Dover Point Rd., Dover, New Hampshire
- Coordinates: 43°8′26″N 70°50′21″W
- Area: 0.4 acres (0.16 ha)
- Built: 1653
- Architect: Walderne, Richard
- NRHP reference No.: 83001153
- Added to NRHP: May 27, 1983

The First Parish Church Site-Dover Point is a historic church site on Dover Point Road in Dover, New Hampshire. It is the site of the second meetinghouse of the First Parish Church, a congregation established in 1633. Built in 1653 and demolished in the 18th century, its well-preserved site is one of the few colonial church sites known to be fortified against native attacks, with a log palisade and earthworks. The site was listed on the National Register of Historic Places in 1983.

== Description and history ==
Dover Point is a neck of land in southernmost Dover, separating the Piscataqua River from the Bellamy River and the Great Bay. Its southern tip, Hilton Point, is where Dover's first settlers arrived from Salem, Massachusetts in 1633. Their first colonial meeting house was built at that point, and its site has been obliterated by the construction of the Spaulding Turnpike. The second meetinghouse was built further north on the point in 1653, nearer where the settlers had established their first village.

The meetinghouse was, according to surviving documentation, 40 feet (12 m) long and 26 feet (7.9 m) wide. Sometime between 1667 and 1675, it was fortified by the construction of an embankment with a log palisade on top. This defense was apparently successful in helping provide for the community's defense in King Philip's War. In 1713 a new meetinghouse was built at "Pine Hill", where Dover's center is now located, and services were halted at this location around 1720. The building was demolished later in the 18th century and the site abandoned, but its location remained well known, and was documented in local histories. In 1889 it was deeded back to the congregation, which has maintained it since.

The site is located on the west side of Dover Point Road, opposite its junction with Forsythia Drive. It is marked by a sign and its road-facing edge is lined by a low stone retaining wall. The grassy area of the site encompasses the foundations of the church and the earthworks that surrounded it. The earthworks was a roughly rectangular embankment, from which there were projections at two of the corners. These projections are where elevated observation sconces were built.

== See also ==
- National Register of Historic Places listings in Strafford County, New Hampshire
