= First Parish Church (Taunton, Massachusetts) =

- U.S. Historic district – Contributing property
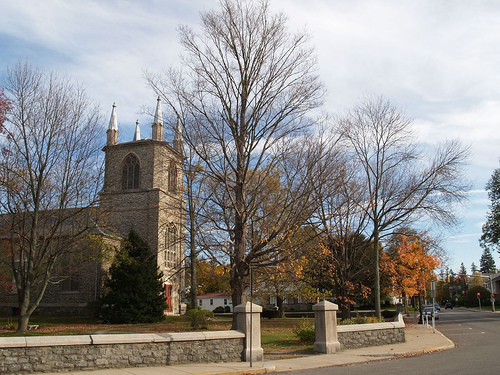
- First Parish Church, on historic Church Green
- Location: Church Green, Taunton, Massachusetts
- Coordinates: 41°54′4″N 71°5′18″W
- Part of: Church Green Historic District (ID77000168)
- Added to NRHP: December 16, 1977

First Parish Church is a historic church located within the Church Green Historic District in Taunton, Massachusetts. It is the fourth meetinghouse since 1647 to be located on what was the original town common. The current church building was built in 1830, constructed of field stone in the Gothic Revival style.

The church steeple is capped with four pinnacles and contains the 1804 bell from the third meetinghouse. In 1869 the sanctuary was enlarged and a chapel was also added. In 1965 another addition was made to the east.

== Parish history ==
The First Parish was established in 1637 by a group of Puritans from Devonshire, England, led by Elizabeth Pole, by way of Dorchester, Massachusetts. In 1640, they renamed the new settlement after Taunton, England. The First Parish was the first church to be established in what would become Bristol County, Massachusetts, and only the fifth church to be established within Plymouth Colony.

The first two meetinghouses built on Church Green also served as the location for civic and political business until 1746. The third church was built in 1794, and was designed by architect Charles Bulfinch.

The parish is now a Unitarian-Universalist congregation.

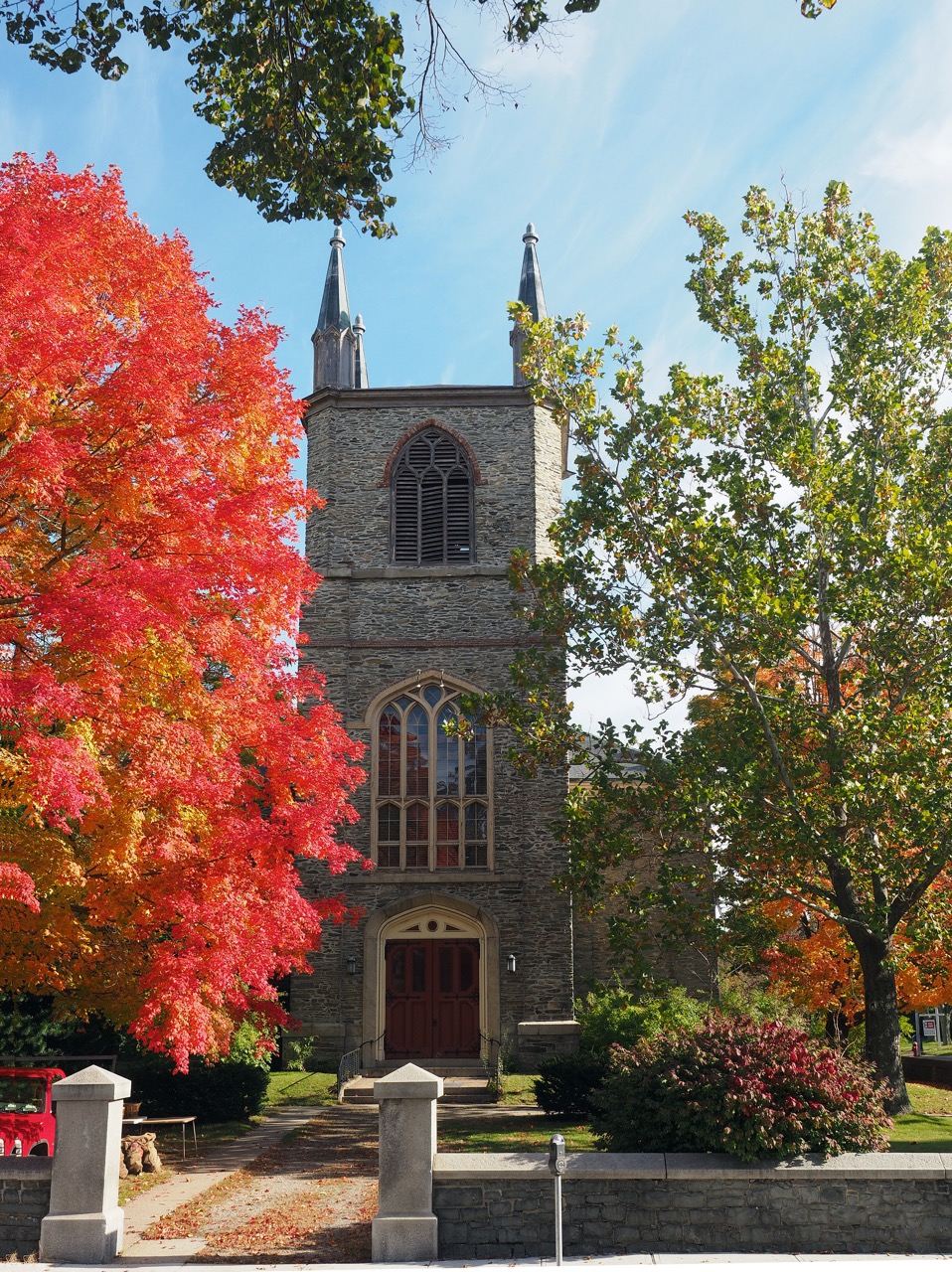
On Taunton Massachusetts Church Green

The church has a Tiffany stained glass window.

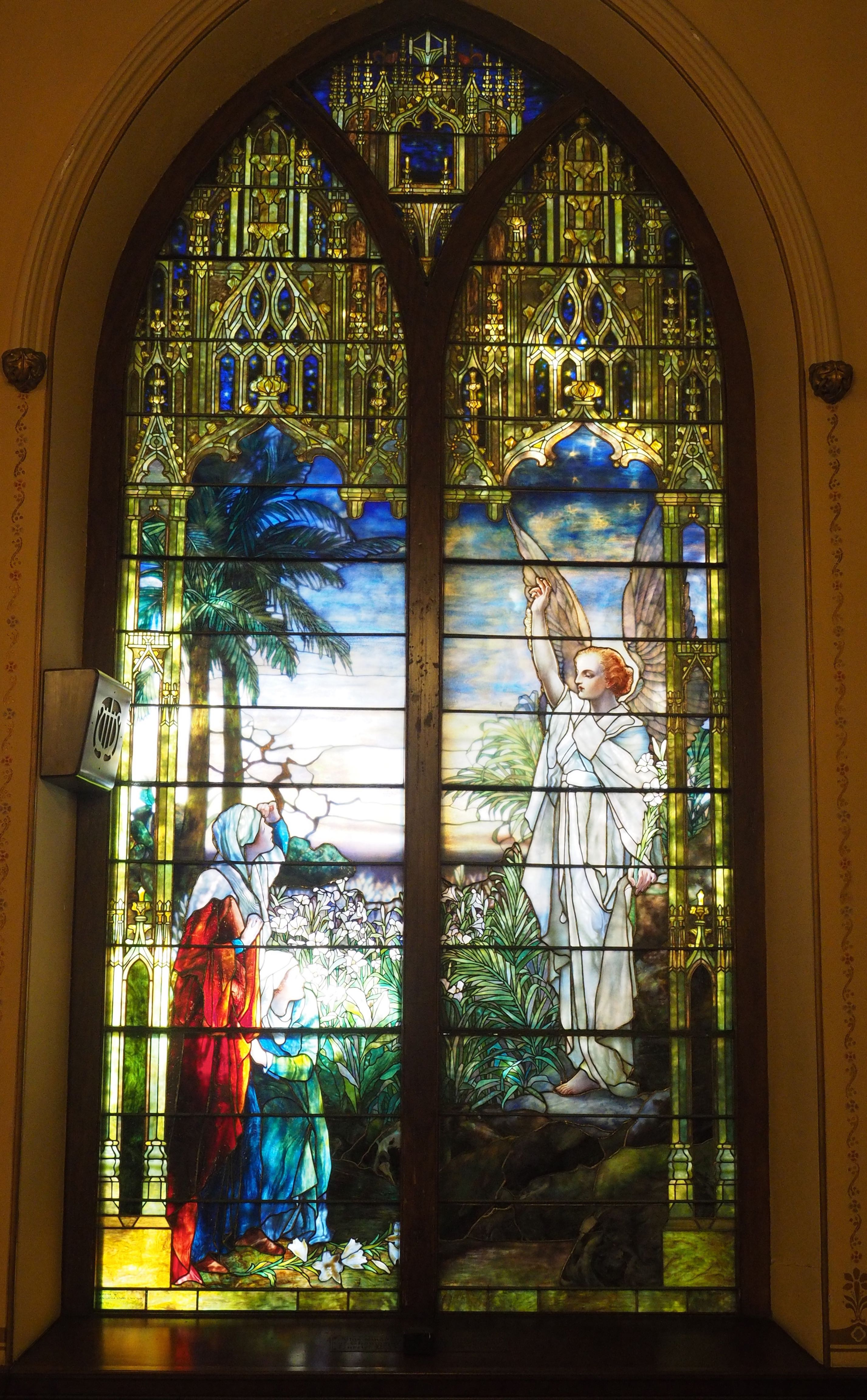
Taunton Mass First Parish Church

== See also ==
- Old Colony Historical Society
- Taunton City Hall
- National Register of Historic Places listings in Taunton, Massachusetts
