= Dean House =

Dean House or Dean Farm may refer to:

== Scotland ==
- Dean House, Edinburgh, near Edinburgh in 1594 and in or near modern Edinburgh, site of incident involving Provost of Edinburgh Alexander Home of North Berwick

== United States ==
(by state)

- L.L. Dean House, Sylacauga, AL, listed on the National Register of Historic Places (NRHP)
- Dean House (Portland, Arkansas), NRHP-listed
- Dean House (Texarkana, Arkansas), NRHP-listed
- Abiezar Dean House, Taunton, MA, NRHP-listed
- Dr. Edgar Everett Dean House, Brockton, MA, NRHP-listed
- Frank L. and Mabel H. Dean House, Worcester, MA, NRHP-listed
- George Dean House, Taunton, MA, NRHP-listed
- Jonathan Dean House, Taunton, MA, NRHP-listed
- Lloyd Dean House, Taunton, MA, NRHP-listed
- Mary Dean Three-Decker, Worcester, MA, NRHP-listed
- Silas Dean House, Stoneham, MA, NRHP-listed
- Theodore Dean House, Taunton, MA, NRHP-listed
- Dean-Barstow House, Taunton, MA, NRHP-listed
- Dean-Hartshorn House, Taunton, MA, NRHP-listed
- A.J. Dean House, Kalispell, MT, NRHP-listed
- Dean Farm (Louisburg, North Carolina), NRHP-listed
- Anna-Dean Farm, Barberton, OH, NRHP-listed
- Dean Family Farm, Jamestown, OH, NRHP-listed
- Dean Family Farm Historic District, Xenia, OH, NRHP-listed
- James Heber Dean House, Beaver, UT, NRHP-listed
- Nathaniel W. Dean House, Madison, WI, NRHP-listed
- Agricultural Dean's House, Madison, WI, NRHP-listed
- Erastus Dean Farmstead, Janesville, WI, NRHP-listed

== See also ==
- Deane House (disambiguation)
