= Deane House =

Deane House may refer to:

in Canada

- Deane House (Fort Calgary), Fort Calgary, Alberta

in the United States

(by state)

- Deane House (Little Rock, Arkansas), listed on the National Register of Historic Places (NRHP)
- Silas Deane House, Wethersfield, Connecticut, NRHP-listed
- Francis Deane Cottage, Uxbridge, Massachusetts, NRHP-listed
- Deane-Williams House, Cambridge, Massachusetts, NRHP-listed
- Deane House (Cofield, North Carolina), NRHP-listed

== See also ==
- Dean House (disambiguation)
