= Frances Dean =

Frances Dean is the name of:

- Frances Drake (1912–2000) née Dean, American actress
- FrancEyE (1922–2009) a.k.a. Frances Dean Smith, American poet

== See also ==
- Frankie Dean (disambiguation)
- Frank Dean (disambiguation)
