= List of killings by law enforcement officers in the United States, March 2019 =

This is a list of people reported killed by non-military law enforcement officers in the United States in March 2019, whether in the line of duty or not, and regardless of reason or method. The listing documents the occurrence of a death, making no implications regarding wrongdoing or justification on the part of the person killed or officer involved. Killings are arranged by date of the incident that caused death. Different death dates, if known, are noted in the description. The table below lists 91 people.

== March 2019 ==
Date	Name (age) of deceased	State (city)	Description
2019-03-31	Nicholas Farah (36)	Nevada (Las Vegas)	Farah, of Appleton, Wisconsin, was arrested after reports of a man behaving strangely. At the jail, police placed Farah in a restraint chair and pushed his head down to his knees, after which Farah became unresponsive. He died, and his death was ruled a homicide due to asphyxia.
2019-03-31	Oscar Cain (31)	Georgia (Atlanta)	Cain was shot and killed by police.
2019-03-31	Stacy William Kenny (33)	Oregon (Springfield)	Kenny was shot and killed by police.
2019-03-31	Kevin Ray McEnulty (25)	Alaska (Fairbanks)	McEnulty was shot and killed by police.
2019-03-31	Juan Padilla (24)	Arizona (Marana)	Padilla was shot and killed by police.
2019-03-30	Pierre J. Cher Frere (25)	Florida (Miami)	Frere was shot and killed by police.
2019-03-30	Ondrae Levado Hutchinson (30)	North Carolina (Durham)	Hutchinson was shot and killed by police.
2019-03-30	Andrew John Mason (22)	North Carolina (Watuaga County)	Mason was shot and killed by police.
2019-03-28	Javier Ambler II (40)	Texas (Austin)	Police officers attempted to stop Ambler after a traffic violation, and Ambler continued driving leading to a police chase until he crashed into a tree. He then exited his vehicle and raised his hands and was tased when officers believed him to be returning to his vehicle, after falling and attempting to stand he was tased around 4 times while pinned by officers. During the incident, that was filmed by Live PD Ambler tells officer that he had congestive heart failure and his death was ruled a homicide, due to medical concerns in combination with forcible restraint.
2019-03-28	Kevin Ray McEnulty (25)	Alaska (Fairbanks)	Responding to a 911 call reporting shots fired, the suspect fled in a vehicle and was pursued by multiple police officers and state troopers, who initiated a traffic stop. As law enforcement personnel approached, the suspect brandished a firearm, prompting the former to open fire on the latter. The suspect died shortly after, and was identified as 25-year-old Kevin Ray McEnulty.
2019-03-28	Eugene Horn (43)	Arizona (Phoenix)	Police officers were investigating a robbery when they observed a van speeding. When police pulled over the van the occupants fled the scene, with onlookers reporting four individuals running from the scene. One of the suspects was cornered by the officers, and when he pointed a gun at the officers, they shot him. He was transported to a hospital where he later died, and was identified as 43-year-old Eugene Horn. Another of the occupants, 24-year-old Calvin Mejia, was arrested and is facing a murder charge.
2019-03-28	Augustine Gutierrez (42)	Texas (San Antonio)	Gutierrez was shot and killed by police.
2019-03-27	Albert Thomas Dashow (39)	Minnesota (Rochester)	An officer attempted to pull over Dashow, who then drove away. Police than physically restrained Dashow, and he died. An autopsy listed the main cause of death as restraint by police.
2019-03-27	Brian Leslie Statler (30)	California (Inglewood)	Statler was shot and killed by police.
2019-03-27	Stephen Marshall (51)	New Hampshire (Manchester)	Marshall was shot and killed by police.
2019-03-27	Daviri Robertson (39)	Louisiana (Terrytown)	Through an informant, Louisiana police officers arranged an undercover sting operation under the pretense of buying drugs from dealers Daviri Robertson and Chris Joseph. As four plainclothed officers surrounded the vehicle that contained the pair, Joseph, the driver, put the car in reverse, striking one of the officers. The other officers opened fire. Joseph was pronounced dead at the scene, while Robertson was transported to a hospital where he later died. One of the officers was accidentally shot in the stomach by his comrades, and was rushed to a hospital in critical but stable condition. The officer struck by the vehicle sustained minor injuries.
2019-03-27	Chris Joseph (38)	Louisiana (Terrytown)	
2019-03-27	Brandon Michael Jacque (25)	Texas (Burnet)	Jacque was shot and killed by police.
2019-03-27	Leonardo Gallegos Jr. (40)	Texas (Cochran County)	Gallegos was shot and killed by police.
2019-03-27	Kevin Samuel Capers (47)	Oklahoma (Chickasha)	Three police officers responded to a call to a house where Kevin Samuel Capers was reportedly threatening his girlfriend with a knife. When the officers arrived at the scene Capers refused to drop the knife and was reported to be acting in a threatening manner. One of the officers then shot Capers, killing him.
2019-03-25	Abraham Arellano (26)	Maryland (Thurmont)	Arellano was shot and killed by police.
2019-03-25	Brandon Coty Elliott (30)	South Carolina (Horry County)	Elliott was shot and killed by police.
2019-03-25	Danquirs Napoleon Franklin (27)	North Carolina (Charlotte)	Franklin was shot and killed by police.
2019-03-25	Kaylon Robinson (18)	Missouri (St. Louis)	Robinson was shot and killed by police.
2019-03-24	Joseph David Durman (46)	Florida (Port St. Joe)	Durman was shot and killed by police.
2019-03-24	Kevin Bruce Mason (57)	Maryland (Baltimore)	Mason was shot and killed by police.
2019-03-22	Bruce Puchel (45)	North Carolina (Ernul)	Puchel was shot and killed by police.
2019-03-22	Derek Smith (22)	South Carolina (Walterboro)	Smith was shot and killed by police.
2019-03-21	Daishawn Brown (19)	California (Modesto)	Brown was shot and killed by police.
2019-03-21	Erick Cruz Ramirez (32)	Georgia (Sandy Springs)	Ramirez was shot and killed by police.
2019-03-20	Stevie Garcia (37)	Nevada (Las Vegas)	Garcia was shot and killed by police.
2019-03-20	Osaze Osagie (29)	Pennsylvania (State College)	Osagie, who had a history of autism and schizophrenia was killed by police in his home when they attempted to serve a mental health warrant. The Centre County District Attorney decided the killing was justified because the victim was alleged to have been carrying a knife. His family sued the police department. His mother Iyun has been outspoken at rallies and memorials across the country including a panel at Oregon State with Trayvon Martin's mother and a George Floyd Protest in her hometown.
2019-03-20	Hannah Westall (26)	Texas (San Antonio)	Westall was shot and killed by police.
2019-03-19	Jesus Calderon (52)	Florida (Tampa)	Calderon was shot and killed by police.
2019-03-19	James Hunn (61)	Missouri (University City)	Hunn was shot by police and died on March 25, 2019 from his injuries.
2019-03-19	Thomas Johnson (22)	Louisiana (Bastrop)	Johnson was shot and killed by police.
2019-03-19	Juan Manuel Flores Del Toro (29)	Washington (Ellensburg)	Del Toro was pulled over by police for driving erratically. When he stopped, Del Toro exited his vehicle and fired on officers. He mortally wounded one and injured another. Officers returned fire, killing Del Toro.
2019-03-18	Kenneth A. Cherry (35)	Ohio (Mansfield)	Cherry was shot and killed by police officers.
2019-03-17	Jorge Luis Rivera-Melendez (33)	Florida (Clermont)	Rivera-Melendez was shot and killed by police.
2019-03-16	Timothy John Beckwith (49)	California (Palmdale)	Beckwith was shot and killed by police.
2019-03-16	Billy L. Walker (53)	Illinois (Macoupin County)	Walker was shot and killed by police.
2019-03-16	James Young (76)	Oregon (The Dalles)	Young was shot and killed by police officers.
2019-03-15	Michael Cohen (49)	Nevada (Las Vegas)	Cohen robbed a casino at the Bellagio hotel, and was attempting to escape in the valet area. He attempted to escape in a white sedan but could not find the keys. He then attempted to carjack a nearby vehicle. Three police officers were standing near the entrance investigating a unrelated missing persons case. On observing Cohen attempting to carjack the vehicle they approached him. Cohen pulled out a gun and fired a shot in the officers' direction. One of the police fired a single shot back, striking Cohen. He was transported to a hospital where he was pronounced dead.
2019-03-14	Jerry Marrero (38)	Florida (Jacksonville)	Marrero was shot and killed by police.
2019-03-14	George Wayne McCallum (33)	Mississippi (Monroe County)	McCallum was shot and killed by police.
2019-03-14	Shawn Taylor Waite (27)	Oklahoma (Sallisaw)	Waite was shot and killed by police.
2019-03-14	Jason Williams (42)	New Jersey (Trenton)	Williams was shot and killed by police.
2019-03-14	Victor J. Morales Zavala (25)	Oregon (Ontario)	Zavala was shot and killed by police.
2019-03-13	Nina C. Adams (47)	Pennsylvania (Greensburg)	Adams was shot and killed by police.
2019-03-13	Charles Ballard (41)	California (Ashland)	Ballard was shot and killed by police.
2019-03-13	Benjamin Melendez (29)	Nebraska (Grand Island)	Melendez was shot and killed by police.
2019-03-13	Henry Wayne Rivera (30)	Arizona (Phoenix)	Rivera was shot and killed by police.
2019-03-12	Robert Mark Frady (45)	Georgia (Salacoa)	Frady was shot and killed by police.
2019-03-12	Brandon Stacey (31)	Michigan (Kalamazoo)	Stacey was shot and killed by police.
2019-03-12	Latasha Nicole Walton (32)	Florida (Miami)	Walton was shot and killed by police.
2019-03-11	Michael J. D'Angelo (34)	Maryland (Westminster)	D'Angelo was shot and killed by police.
2019-03-11	Douglas Kilburn (54)	Vermont (Burlington)	Kilburn got into a confrontation with an officer outside a hospital, which ended with the officer striking Kilburn in the head three times. Kilburn suffered multiple bone fractures and died three days later.
2019-03-10	Sokhom Hon (31)	California (San Bernardino)	Hon, who was armed, reportedly approached police officers, yelling at them to shoot him. After not obeying verbal orders to drop his weapon, police tasered him, but it was unsuccessful. When Hon reportedly charged, the officers shot and killed him. The incident is being investigated as a possible suicide by cop.
2019-03-10	Anthony Lee Montoya (51)	Colorado (Lakewood)	Montoya was shot and killed by police.
2019-03-10	Phillip Wayne Outland (44)	North Carolina (Cofield)	Outland was reportedly acting aggressive while holding a handgun. When he reportedly disobeyed police orders, he was shot.
2019-03-10	Brandon Starr Robertson (34)	California (Redding)	Robertson was shot and killed by police.
2019-03-10	Emeri Connery (26)	Virginia (Lee County)	Connery was shot and killed by her cousin, Big Stone Gap officer Bailey Smith, hours after leaving a wedding. Smith then shot himself.
2019-03-09	Joel David Kellay (46)	Michigan (Pennfield Township)	Kellay got into a fight with his wife, when he pulled out a gun and shot at her but missed. She fled the house and called 911. Meanwhile two of his sons attempted to disarm Kellay, one was shot in the stomach and another in the arm. Three police officers arrived at the scene, when Kellay emerged from the house and fired at them. All three officers returned fire and killed Kellay. None of the officers were wounded, neither was his wife. Kellay's two sons were rushed to the hospital.
2019-03-09	Jose German (40)	Arizona (Buckeye)	German was shot and killed by police.
2019-03-09	Eric Hagstrom (35)	Arizona (Phoenix)	Police were called to a domestic disturbance, where a woman reported that Hagstrom was reacting violently. Officers responding to the scene found Hagstorm in a driveway, lying down and holding a gun. Hagstorm disobeyed orders to drop the gun, and when he pointed it at one of the officers he was shot. Hagstorm died later in hospital.
2019-03-09	Rodney Lassiter (30)	Texas (Monahans)	Lassiter was shot and killed by police.
2019-03-09	Beth Plant (51)	Tennessee (Ashland City)	Plant was shot after allegedly pulling a knife on a police officer. She was the mother of super middleweight boxing champion Caleb Plant.
2019-03-09	Tommy Wayne Welch (59)	Texas (Quanah)	Welch was shot and killed by police.
2019-03-08	Thomas Wayne Swinford (34)	Georgia (Athens)	Police stopped a black SUV that had earlier been reported stolen, when Swinford got out of the car and started approaching the officers holding a realistic looking BB gun. After ignoring verbal commands by officers to drop the gun and stop moving towards them, the officers shot and killed Swinford.
2019-03-07	Carlos Hunter (43)	Washington (Vancouver)	Two police detectives pulled over a vehicle in a drug investigation. The driver was armed and according to the report did not comply with orders, which resulted in both officers shooting and killing him. The man was later identified as 43-year-old Carlos Hunter.
2019-03-07	Rodney Fisher (NA)	Arkansas (Jonesboro)	Reporting to a call by a property owner of two individuals trespassing, officers approached the two, when they realised that one of them was Rodney Fisher, who was wanted as a suspect for the recent murder of 44-year-old David Allen Marshall. As the officers approached Fisher pulled out a handgun, to which the officers responded by shooting and killing him.
2019-03-07	Dylan Aikey (23)	Alaska (Anchorage)	Aikey was shot and killed by police.
2019-03-06	Donquale Maurice Gray (25)	West Virginia (Morgantown)	Gray was shot and killed by police officers.
2019-03-05	Joshua Worth (31)	Mississippi (Greenville)	Worth was shot and killed by police.
2019-03-05	Antonio Joseph Valentine (32)	Florida (Jacksonville)	Six officers approached a pickup truck of a sexual battery suspect who was inside. The suspect was reported to be uncooperative and rolled up his windows. After the suspect grabbed a gun and rolled over toward them, the six officers opened fire. The suspect was shot multiple times and died. The deceased suspect was later identified as 32-year-old Antonio Joseph Valentine.
2019-03-05	Stephanie Areanda Quiroz (21)	California (Bakersfield)	Quiroz was shot and killed by police.
2019-03-05	Jared D. Kelly (36)	Missouri (Springfield)	According to police reports, officers approached Kelly, who was a wanted fugitive. As the officers approached him, Kelly allegedly pulled out a hand gun, which the officers reacted to by shooting him. Kelly was transported to a hospital where he later died.
2019-03-05	Steven Louis Goins (22)	Georgia (DeKalb)	Goins attempted to rob a Family Dollar store right before it closed at 10 p.m. As officers approached the scene Goins fired a shot at them. The officers responded by shooting Goins, who was then transported to the hospital in critical condition, where he later died.
2019-03-05	Danny Brogdon (56)	Oklahoma (Muskogee)	Police responding to a stabbing call came to a house and found two women with stab wounds and another who had been beaten. A man confronted police at the house holding a large knife. According to the police, several non-lethal methods were attempted to disarm the man, including trying to reason with him, using a stun gun, than a stun grenade, and finally a taser although none were effective and the man continued to hold onto the knife and act in a threatening manner. One of the police officers then shot the suspect, killing him. The three women were transported to a hospital. Two days after the incident the eight officers involved were placed on paid leave and the suspect was identified as 56-year-old Danny Brogdon.
2019-03-04	Shamikle Jackson (22)	Colorado (Aurora)	Jackson was shot and killed by police.
2019-03-04	Stephen Kaylor (63)	California (Rancho Mirage)	Police responded to two separate 911 calls of an active gunman at an orthopedic center, with reports of shots being fired. As police approached the scene they confronted and shot Kaylor, who was armed, who was treated and died shortly after.
2019-03-04	Jeremy Ponce (17)	Texas (San Antonio)	Police responded to a robbery where an armed man had robbed and shot an individual in the leg. The suspect fled in a car with a woman and two children. Police pursued the car, where it eventually stopped at an intersection. The suspected got out of the car and started shooting at the police officers. The two police officers returned fire and hit the suspect multiple times. He was transported to a hospital where he died hours later, and was identified as 17-year-old Jeremy Ponce. The responding officers and the other occupants of the car where not injured, the condition of the robbery victim is unknown.
2019-03-04	Daniel Moncada (27)	Texas (San Antonio)	Police responding to a domestic violence call at a house were suddenly confronted by a man in his mid-20s who fired on them with a shotgun. The officer returned fire and hit the man multiple times. The individual died soon after, and was later identified as 27-year-old Daniel Moncada.
2019-03-04	Luke Anthony Swann (36)	Iowa (Des Moines)	3 officers responding to a robbery pursued a stolen car before it drove into a one-way street. The suspect than fled on foot. The officers confronted the suspect hiding behind a garage. As the officers came closer the suspect shot at them. The officers returned fire and killed him. One of the officers was treated for minor injured, the deceased man was later identified as 36-year-old Luke Anthony Swann.
2019-03-04	Ricky Lee Prichard (49)	Michigan (Sebewaing)	Police arrived at a house where a standoff was occurring; Prichard was inside the house and armed along with his girlfriend and mother. Police say that they were forced to break into the house when they heard gun shots, as Pricard allegedly shot his girlfriend. Police entered the house and exchanged gunfire with Prichard, who was shot and killed.
2019-03-03	Roy Anthony Scott (65)	Nevada (Las Vegas)	Scott, who had schizophrenia and other mental health problems, was stopped by police outside his apartment. Scott was carrying a phone, pipe, and knife, but willingly turned these items over during questioning. However, when police attempted to pat him down, Scott began to resist, and in undisclosed circumstances, the police responded in a way that resulted in Scott being taken to a hospital, where he was pronounced dead. His family have filed a lawsuit.
2019-03-03	Robert Richardson (40)	Washington (Glenoma)	Police pulled over a vehicle Richardson was driving for a traffic violation. Checking his license, the officers realized that there was a warrant out for Richardson for first-degree child rape and two counts of second-degree child molestation. Police asked Richardson to get out of the vehicle, when he allegedly pointed a weapon at them. At seeing the weapon the officers opened fire and killed him.
2019-03-02	Larry Todd Hoover (33)	North Carolina (Mount Holly)	Police responded to a call of a mentally disturbed man starting a fire in an apartment. Responding to the scene they saw Hoover jump from a burning building carrying a sword. When Hoover allegedly acted in a threatening manner he was shot and killed by the officer. Hoover had been released three days earlier from jail for a probation violation.
2019-03-02	Tyler J. Meier (46)	Wisconsin (Fairchild)	Meier was shot and killed by police.
2019-03-01	Maurice Arrisgado Jr. (47)	Hawaii (Honolulu)	Arrisgado, who had been arrested four days earlier for attacking a police officer with a knife, managed to escape from the OCCC correctional facility as he was waiting with two guards to be moved to another cell. The correctional officers managed to catch up and shot and killed Arrisgado outside St. Anthony Church on Puuhale Road.
2019-03-01	Brenda Rodriguez Mendoza (20)	California (Salinas)	Three officers arrived at a vehicle where a woman had armed and barricaded herself. The woman then emerged from the vehicle brandishing a handgun. All three officers opened fire, killing the individual. The deceased woman was later identified as 20-year-old Brenda Rodriguez Mendoza.

== See also ==
- Death in custody § United States
- Henry A. Wallace Police Crime Public Database
- List of cases of police brutality
- List of countries with annual rates and counts for killings by law enforcement officers
- List of law enforcement officers killed in the line of duty in the United States
- List of law enforcement officers convicted for an on-duty killing in the United States
- List of shootings by US immigration agents
- List of police reforms related to the George Floyd protests
- List of unarmed African Americans killed by law enforcement officers in the United States
- Lists of killings by law enforcement officers
- Police brutality in the United States
- Police misconduct § United States
- Police riot § United States
- Police use of deadly force in the United States
