= George Floyd protests in Pennsylvania =

2020 civil unrest after the murder of George Floyd

- Part of George Floyd protests
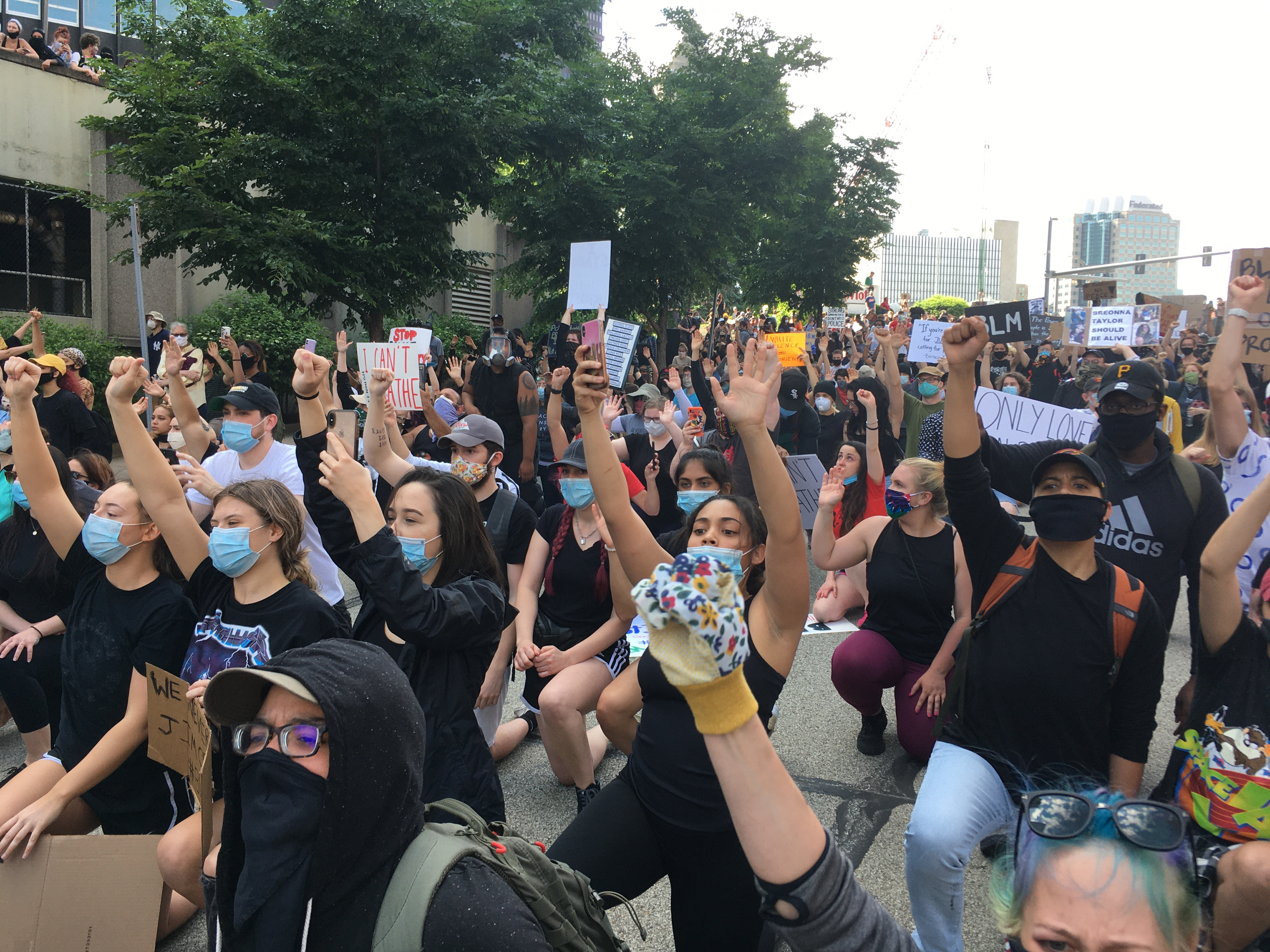
- Protesters in Pittsburgh, Pennsylvania on May 30
- Date: May 28 – July 2020 (1 month and 3 days)
- Location: Pennsylvania, United States
- Caused by: Police brutality; Institutional racism against African Americans; Reaction to the murder of George Floyd; Economic, racial and social inequality

Cities in Pennsylvania in which a protest with about 100 or more participants was held

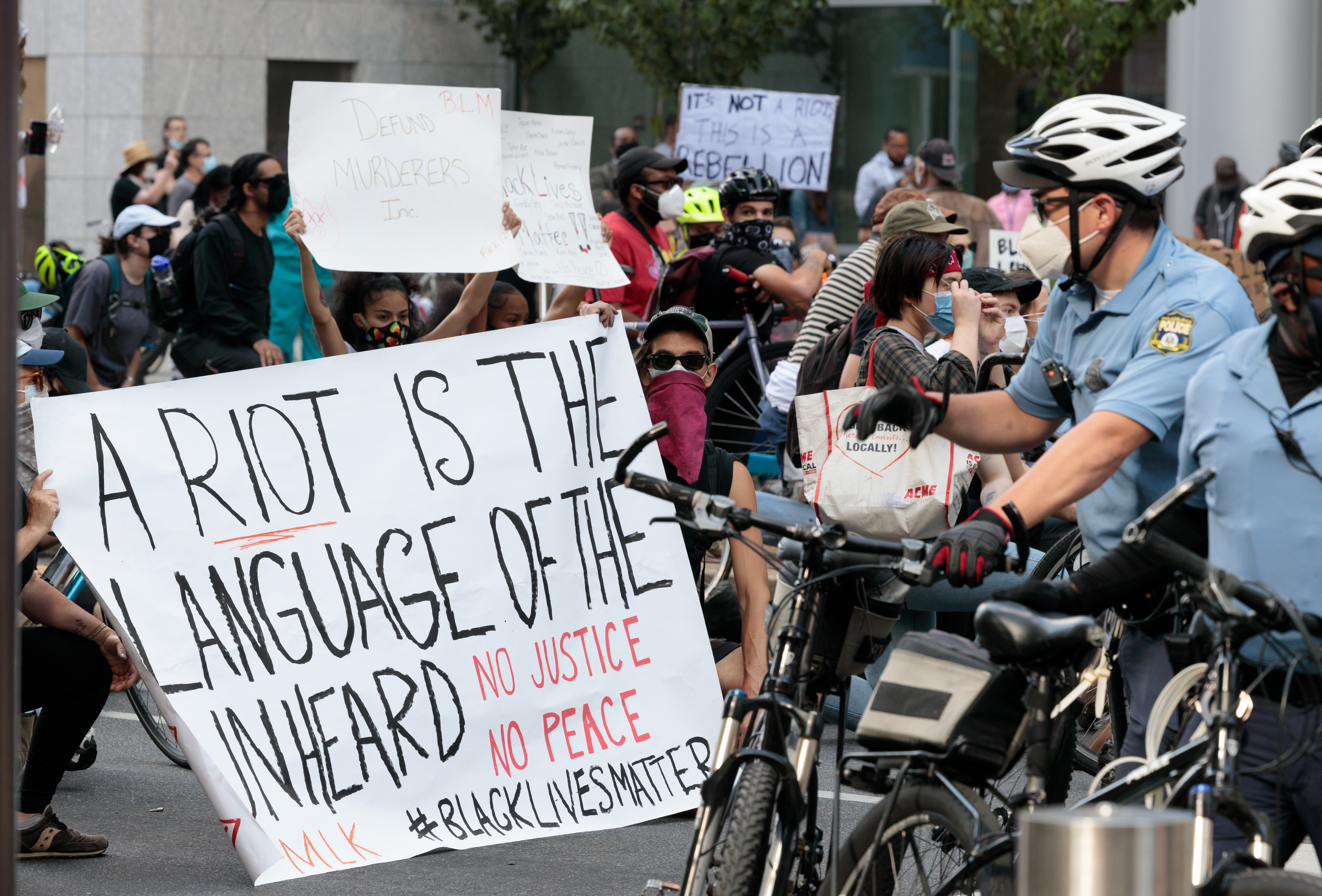
Philadelphia on June 1

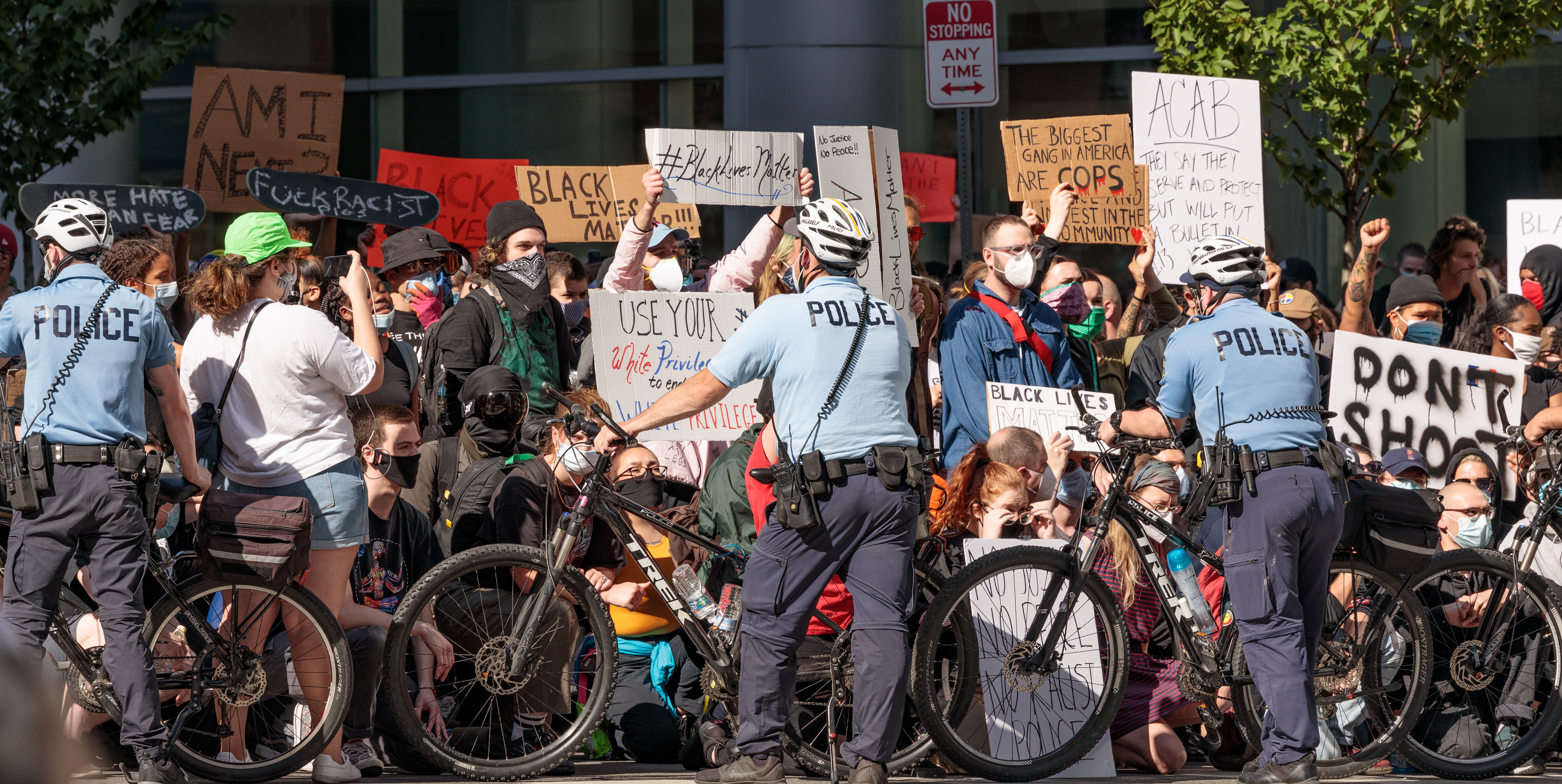
Philadelphia on June 1

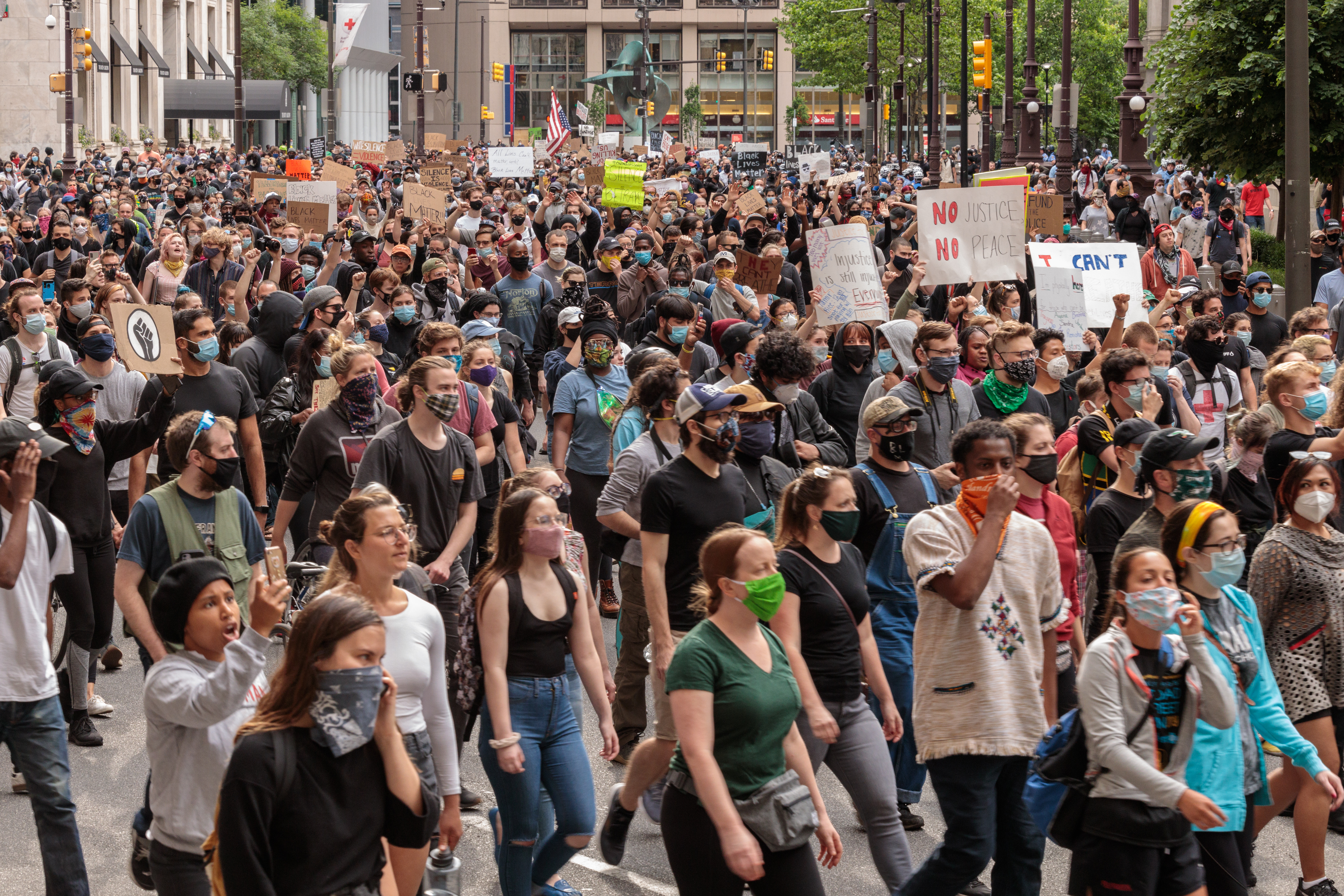
Philadelphia on June 2

This is a list of protests that took place in Pennsylvania in 2020 following the murder of George Floyd.

== Locations ==
=== Northcentral ===
- Bloomsburg: On June 2, around 500 people took part in a peaceful protest, rallying for an end to police brutality and racism.
- Danville: At 2 P.M. on June 7, around 250 protesters gathered in Memorial Park in Danville, holding signs and chanting in protest of police brutality.
- Lewisburg: On May 31, protesters held signs on the intersection of Routes 15 and 45.
- Mifflinburg: On June 7, hundreds of protesters took to the streets in Mifflinburg to protest police brutality and racism. The rally was organized by a group from Milton.
- Milton: Around 200 protesters marched peacefully on May 31, holding signs and making speeches. After about two hours, the protest grew heated, filling Filbert Street in front of the police department. The protesters called for two of the Union County Sheriff's deputies called in to assist Milton police to join the crowd. Milton Police Officer Laura Messa later came out to shake hands with the protesters.
- Selinsgrove: On May 31, around 300 protesters held a candlelight march to pay their respects to George Floyd and others who have died at the hands of the police.
- State College: On May 31, more than 1,000 community members nonviolently protested for about four hours at a rally organized by an area high school student, marching from Penn State's campus to the State College police department. Speakers included a former Penn State basketball player, the mayor, and local high school and university student leaders. The mother of Osaze Osagie, an African-American man killed after a confrontation with State College police in 2019, spoke out. Over 1,000 people marched again on June 7, and hundreds returned to block off primary streets downtown for over twelve hours on June 14.
- Williamsport: Hundreds of people gathered on the west side of Williamsport on June 5 for the "Walk About It, Be About It" march. Marchers walked seven miles from Williamsport to Montoursville carrying signs with messages against police brutality and injustice.

=== Northeastern ===
- Allentown: A subdued rally occurred on May 30 at Seventh and Hamilton Streets. Mayor Ray O'Connell spoke to the crowd but was heckled for claiming "This is not my America!"
- Bethlehem: On May 30, hundreds of demonstrators demanded an end to police brutality at the Bethlehem Rose Garden followed by a march to City Hall.
- Easton: On May 31, an estimated 1,500 protesters came out to Center Square and marched several laps on the streets before marching to City Hall.
- Pen Argyl: On June 27, hundreds of protesters marched in support of Black Lives Matter. Along the way, they were met by a group of counter-protesters.
- Scranton: Dozens of people peacefully protested at Courthouse Square on May 30.
- Stroudsburg: About 300 people attended a vigil organized by the local chapter of the NAACP at the Monroe County Courthouse on May 31.
- Wilkes-Barre: Dozens of people held up signs and chanted "Black Lives Matter" at a center city public square on May 30.

=== Northwestern ===
- Bradford: Roughly 15 protesters assembled at Veterans Square on June 1.
- DuBois: A handful of protesters peacefully rallied on Liberty Boulevard on June 1.
- Erie: Several hundred people chanted "No Justice! No Peace!" and carried signs reading "I Can't Breathe" in and around Perry Square on May 30 beginning at 6 PM, turning violent in the evening around 9 PM. Protesters vandalized city hall, businesses were looted and vandalized, a small fire was set at the Erie Otters office, and water bottles and fireworks were thrown at police. Police fired tear gas at the crowd from the roof of city hall around 9:30 PM and the SWAT team was assembled an hour later. A man was shot in the thigh around 11 PM. A 21-year-old woman who was peacefully protesting was maced sometime between 11:30 PM and midnight after she sat down in the street while police were telling the crowd to disperse. She was then kicked over onto the ground from a seated position by a SWAT officer while covering her face with her arms to shield herself. The woman stated that when her arms fell away from her eyes due to being knocked over, she was maced directly in the face and then fled after the officers threatened to taze her. The clip gained national attention, including being retweeted Minnesota congresswomen Ilhan Omar.
- Farrell: On June 5, a car drove through protesters in Farrell. Nobody was hurt. Charges were later filed against the driver (on June 9) and four protesters (on June 16).
- Hermitage: On May 31, nearly 200 protesters marched and laid on the streets causing police to direct traffic away from the location. Protesters stood and chanted in front of the National Guard office in the region. The local Walmart was evacuated and closed early. The crowd was mostly peaceful.
- Meadville: Over 150 protesters took to the street on May 31 to protest the murder of George Floyd.
- New Castle: About 100 protesters peacefully marched through downtown on the afternoon of May 31 led by Mayor Chris Frye and the city's police chief.
- Oil City: A protest was held on June 7, drawing about 200 people.
- Punxsutawney: Punxsutawney area students held a protest in support of Black Lives Matter in Barclay Square on June 1.
- St. Marys: A protest was held on June 7.
- Sharon: On May 31, protesters marched from Shenango Valley to the Sharon Municipal Building to peacefully protest Floyd's murder.

=== Southcentral ===
- Carlisle: On May 30, about 80 protesters rallied against police brutality and demanded justice for George Floyd. On June 6, several hundred protesters marched on Public Square near the Cumberland County Courthouse.
- Chambersburg: Over 75 protesters peacefully gathered in downtown Chambersburg to demand justice for George Floyd on June 1.
- Greencastle: On Sunday, June 7, protesters gathered on the northwest corner of Greencastle's square to protest the murder of George Floyd, raise awareness of other victims, and highlight the atrocities of police brutality.
- Hanover: Beginning on May 29, protesters peacefully stood in a multi-day rally titled, like many other nationwide rallies, "Black Lives Matter".

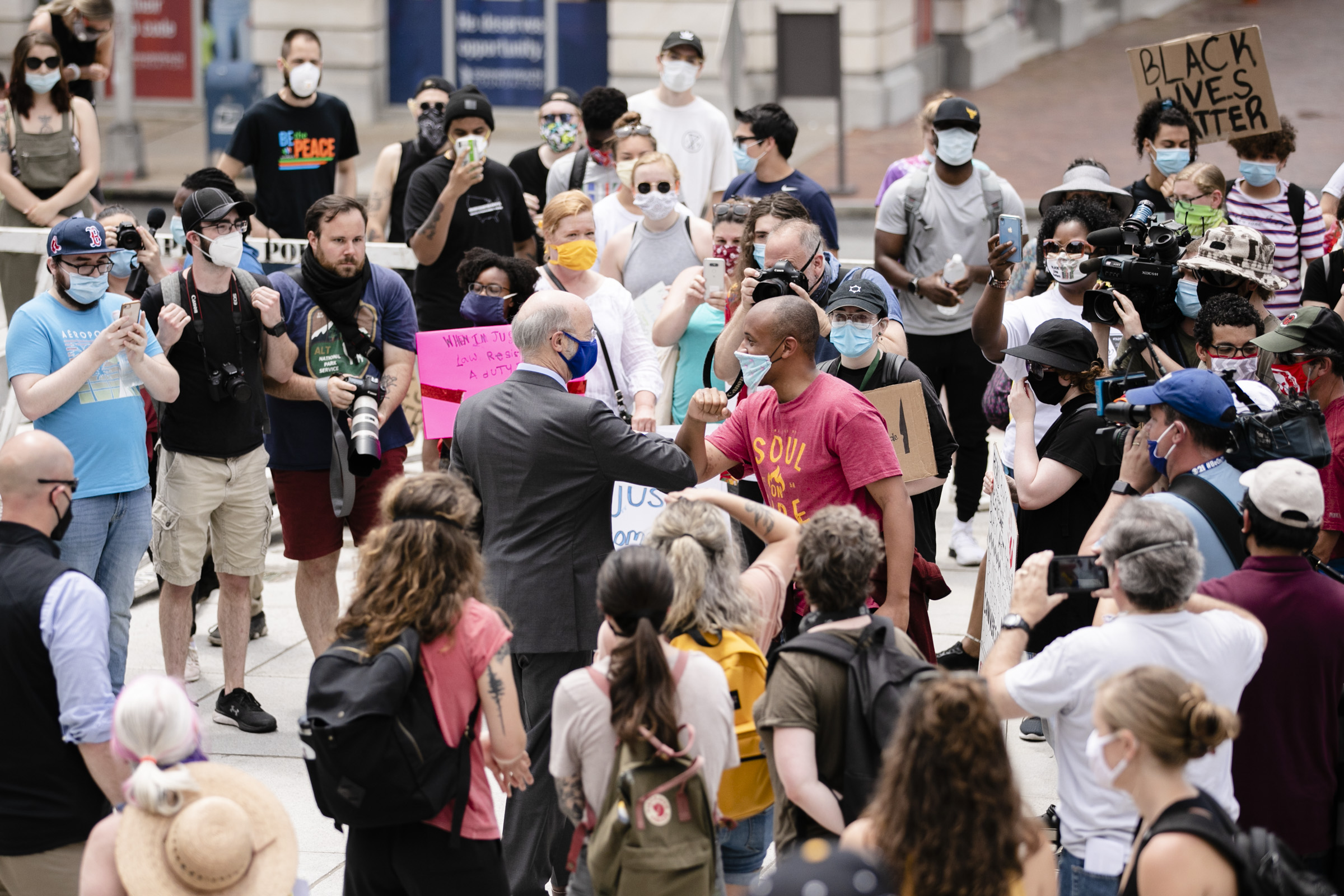
Governor Tom Wolf joining protesters in Harrisburg on June 3, 2020

- Harrisburg: Protesters surrounded a police car after a peaceful rally on May 30 that began at the State Capitol. Riot police were summoned to shoot pepper spray into the crowd. On June 3, Governor Tom Wolf joined protests, condemning the murder of George Floyd while also calling for an end to violence at protests.
- Hershey: On June 6, 100 to 200 protesters marched around town, starting at Chocolate Avenue. The protest consisted of a moment of silence and the march went through the main residential areas of Hershey.
- Hollidaysburg: On May 31, hundreds of protesters rallied at the amphitheater in Canal Basin Park at 6 p.m. to protest the murder of George Floyd.
- Gettysburg: On May 28, roughly 200 people filled historic Gettysburg Square to protest the murder of George Floyd. On July 4, false reports of a planned protest by antifa groups led around 500 counter-protesters to attend Gettysburg National Cemetery, where around 50 surrounded and questioned a man wearing a Black Lives Matter shirt.
- Lebanon: On June 4, hundreds of people marched throughout Lebanon while chanting "No justice, no peace" and "Black Lives Matter" in a peaceful protest in memory of George Floyd and other black men and women killed within the United States. The city's mayor, Sherry Capello said she and others were standing in unity with the protesters, asking others to respect one another. However, the protest became tense for a period as the police chief and two other police officers declined to kneel alongside protesters and instead walked away, prompting the marching around the city.
- Shippensburg: On June 9, hundreds of protesters gathered at the gazebo on King Street. Local politicians, clergy and police officers joined the group in a moment of silence for eight minutes 46 seconds.
- Waynesboro: On June 2, over 70 protesters assembled on the square of Waynesboro to decry police brutality and George Floyd's murder.
- York: For two consecutive days over 1,000 protesters demonstrated against police brutality and Floyd's murder, holding signs reading "Black Lives Matter" and "Racism is not tolerated here".

=== Southeastern ===
- Coatesville: Thousands gathered in front of Coatesville City Hall on June 4. Members of the city council were present.
- Doylestown: Hundreds of protesters marched and chanted for justice for George Floyd on June 1.
- Hatboro: On June 25, a rally in support of Black Lives Matter took place. The rally was organized by two teenagers.
- Kennett Square: On June 1, nearly a thousand protesters peacefully rallied in downtown Kennett to protest Floyd's murder.
- King of Prussia: On the night of May 30, looters targeted the King of Prussia Mall. The windows to the Macy's store at the mall were broken while windows were also broken at a nearby AT&T store. A total of 12 people were arrested. A curfew was implemented in Upper Merion Township.
- Kutztown: On June 7, the Kutztown Area Solidarity March supporting Black Lives Matter took place along Main Street.
- Lancaster: Hundreds of protesters peacefully gathered at a rally named "We've had enough, time to stand" on the morning of May 31.
- Levittown: About 50 protesters gathered at the Five Points intersection on May 31 for a peaceful protest.
- Lititz: On June 12, a group of protesters marched from Lititz Springs Park through the downtown area in support of Black Lives Matter.
- New Hope: On June 6 at around 5:45 pm, after marching and listening to speeches in Lambertville, New Jersey, hundreds of peaceful Black Lives Matter protesters crossed the New Hope–Lambertville Bridge into New Hope, Pennsylvania and continued to march down South Main Street.
- Norristown: On June 3, protesters marched from Bridgeport to the Montgomery County Courthouse in Norristown.
- Philadelphia:
- Pottstown: A small protest demanding justice for George Floyd was held in Pottstown on June 1, the protest was joined by the Pottstown Police.
- Reading: Hundreds of protesters marched to City Hall and across the Penn Street Bridge to demand justice for George Floyd on May 31. Another peaceful rally took place on June 1 as protesters marched from City Hall to City Park.
- Spring Township: On June 3, hundreds of people participated in a peaceful protest. The two-mile march began at Wilson High School and ended at the township municipal building.
- Upper Darby: On May 31, peaceful protests occurred after businesses were looted in the 69th Street business district. A total of 12 people were arrested. A curfew was implemented by the township. On June 3, a group known as UDTJ hosted numerous peaceful sidewalk protests with more than 50 protesters in attendance. On June 13, UDTJ hosted a peaceful march with more than 100 protesters in attendance from Beverly Hills Middle School to the Upper Darby Police Station taking a knee on West Chester Pike.
- West Chester: More than 40 protesters gathered at the historic Chester County Courthouse on May 31. Several demonstrators returned on June 1 and pledged to come back every evening this week. On June 4, approximately 5,000 protesters rallied for equality and criminal justice reform at a "March for Peace, Justice and Humanity" from Borough Hall to the historic Courthouse.
- Yardley: Over 1,000 people marched on June 4 through town, followed by a moment of silence near the Yardley train station.

=== Southwestern ===
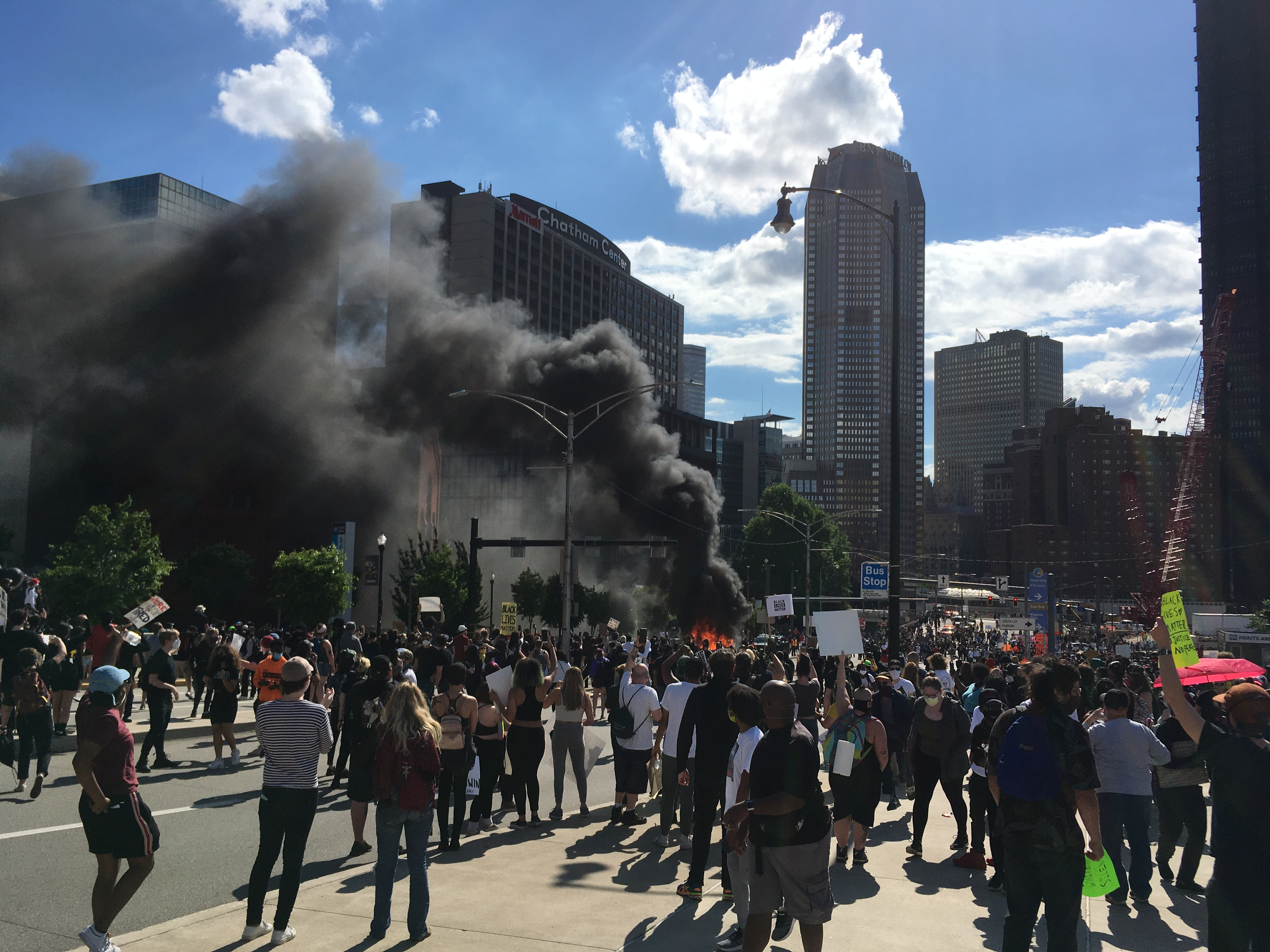
Burning police car in Pittsburgh on May 30

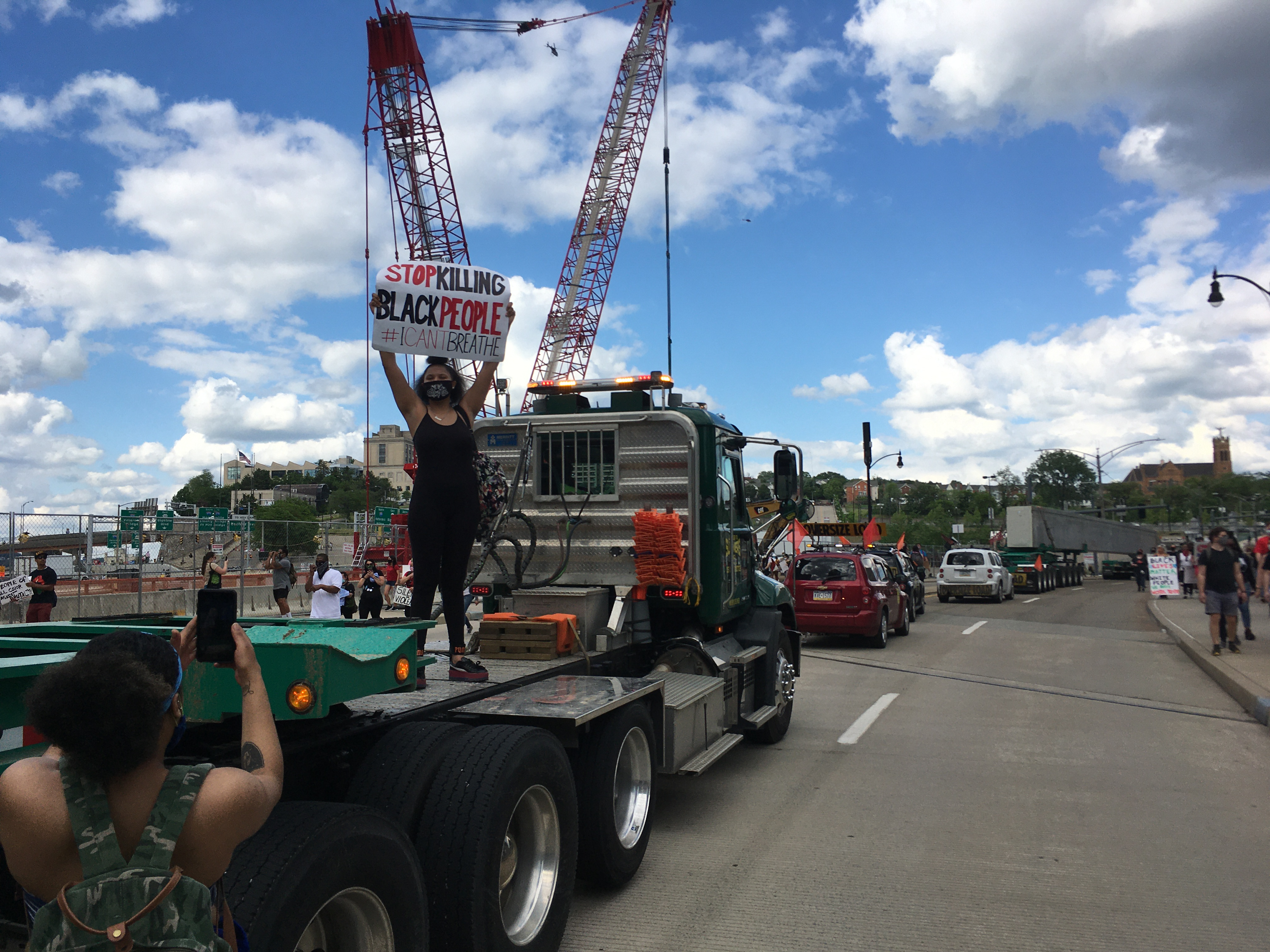
Protester in Pittsburgh holding a sign reading "Stop Killing Black People"

- Butler: Protesters gathered at Diamond Park on June 1. A scuffle broke out, resulting in 8 people being arrested.
- Greensburg: Roughly 200 protesters assembled peacefully and marched from the county courthouse to Saint Clair Park on June 1.
- Indiana: Roughly 150 protesters gathered peacefully on June 3 in the parking lot of Rite Aid on Philadelphia and North Fourth Streets in Indiana, condemning Floyd's murder.
- Johnstown: Roughly 500 protesters gathered at noon on Saturday, June 6 and peacefully marched for several hours, many businesses across Johnstown closed and boarded up in fear of vandalism and looting including Walmart and Petco.
- Kittanning: A protest was held in support of Black Lives Matter on Saturday, June 6.
- Latrobe: More than 100 protesters gathered peacefully at Latrobe Memorial Stadium at 11:30 AM, before marching through the streets of Latrobe demanding justice for George Floyd, on June 1.
- Pittsburgh: More than 3,000 protesters marched through downtown Pittsburgh on the afternoon of May 30. The initially peaceful protest turned into a riot resulting in injuries, looting, and burning of police cars. Police dispersed tear gas in response. Two journalists from KDKA-TV were injured when protesters "stomped and kicked" them and destroyed their camera. Mayor Bill Peduto denounced the vandals as "anarchists, hell bent on chaos and destruction," who "hijacked a peaceful march for justice and exploited it for their own selfish agenda." At least 45 people were arrested and a curfew was set from 8:30 pm until 6 am. On Sunday, May 31, a group of about 150 protesters marched from Market Square to the courthouse on Grant Street. Officials said there were no incidents to report. On Monday, June 1, law enforcement deployed tear gas against protesters in East Liberty and harassed people who recorded the police offensive. 20 protesters were arrested during the June 1 protests in East Liberty. Additional protests were held throughout the week.
- Pleasant Hills: A group of students, parents, and other activists gathered in a parking lot on June 3 to protest police brutality and demand justice for George Floyd.
- Vandergrift: A protest was to be held on Thursday, June 4 in support of Black Lives Matter, but was later cancelled by an organizer. 30 protesters still showed up and held a peaceful demonstration.
- Washington: Protesters gathered in front of the county courthouse on May 31.
