= Lloyd Dean House =

Historic house in Massachusetts, United States

- U.S. National Register of Historic Places
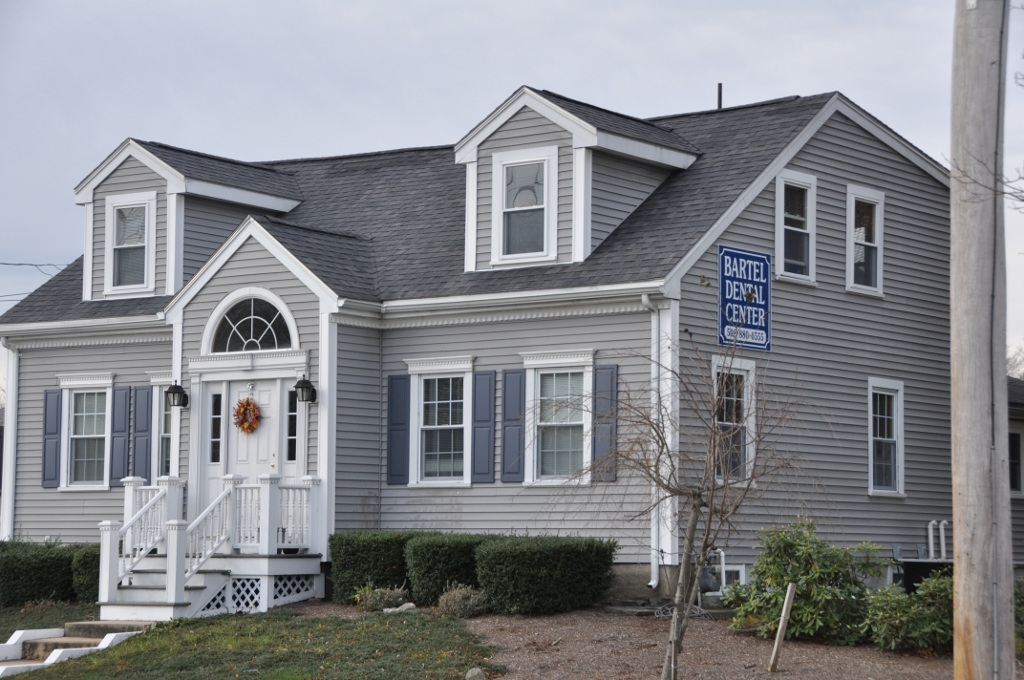

- Location within Massachusetts Location within the United States
- Location: 164 Dean St., Taunton, Massachusetts
- Coordinates: 41°54′22″N 71°4′9″W
- Built: 1825
- Architectural style: Greek Revival, Federal
- MPS: Taunton MRA
- NRHP reference No.: 84002107
- Added to NRHP: July 5, 1984

The Lloyd Dean House is a historic house located at 164 Dean Street in Taunton, Massachusetts.

== Description and history ==
It was built in 1825 in a transitional Greek Revival/Federal style. The property was later owned by Dr. J.W. Hayward.

The five bay wide, 1 1/2-story cottage originally contained clapboard siding with operating wooden shutters and a central doorway with molded wooden trim and a large leaded transom with sidelights. It also had two symmetrical end chimneys.

However, then house has since been significantly altered, with vinyl siding added and the original doors, windows, shutters replaced. The chimneys have been removed and second floor dormers have also been added and the rear roofline raised to a salt box. The central doorway has been modified with a large projecting pediment. It is now occupied by a dental office.

It was added to the National Register of Historic Places on July 5, 1984.

== See also ==
- National Register of Historic Places listings in Taunton, Massachusetts
- Jonathan Dean House formerly located across the street.
