= Frank Dean =

Frank Dean may refer to:

- Frank Dean, a character in Marvel Comics
- Frank L. and Mabel H. Dean House
- Frank Dean (musician), see Shakill's II
- Frank Dean, Harry Dacre’s real name

== See also ==
- Frankie Dean (disambiguation)
