= George Dean House =

Historic house in Massachusetts, United States

- U.S. National Register of Historic Places
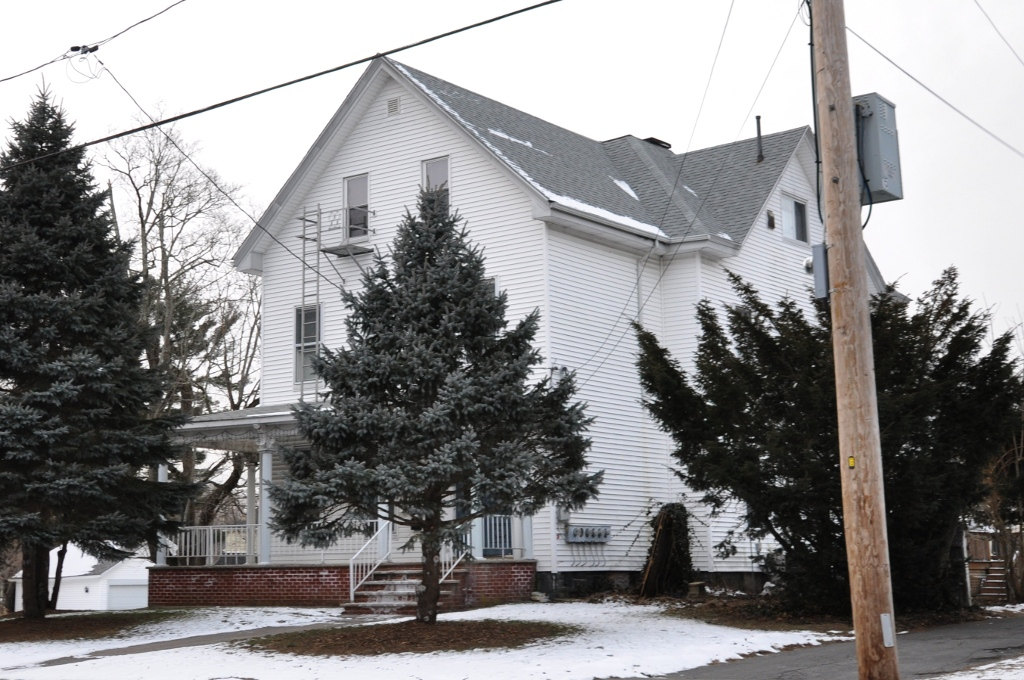

- Location within Massachusetts Location within the United States
- Location: 135 Winthrop St., Taunton, Massachusetts
- Coordinates: 41°53′42″N 71°6′16″W
- Built: 1871
- Architectural style: Italianate
- MPS: Taunton MRA
- NRHP reference No.: 84002105
- Added to NRHP: July 5, 1984

The George Dean House is a historic house located at 135 Winthrop Street in Taunton, Massachusetts.

== Description and history ==
The house was built in 1871 in the Italianate style. The 2 1/2-story, gable front house originally contained clapboard siding with decorative window trims and a large wraparound porch with detailed wood posts. The attic also had two semi-round windows under the front gable.

It was added to the National Register of Historic Places on July 5, 1984. However, since that time, the house has been covered with vinyl siding and the original windows and decorative wood trim has been removed. The large porch has also been altered.

== See also ==
- National Register of Historic Places listings in Taunton, Massachusetts
