= Cofield, North Carolina =

- Village
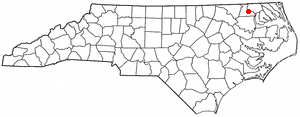
- Location of Cofield, North Carolina
- Coordinates: 36°21′24″N 76°54′38″W
- Country: United States
- State: North Carolina
- County: Hertford

Area
  - Total: 3.14 sq mi (8.13 km^{2})
  - Land: 3.14 sq mi (8.13 km^{2})
  - Water: 0 sq mi (0.00 km^{2})
- Elevation: 43 ft (13 m)

Population (2020)
  - Total: 267
  - Density: 85.0/sq mi (32.82/km^{2})
- Time zone: UTC-5 (Eastern (EST))
  - Summer (DST): UTC-4 (EDT)
- ZIP code: 27922
- Area code: 252
- FIPS code: 37-13460
- GNIS feature ID: 2407435

Cofield is a village in Hertford County, North Carolina, United States. As of the 2020 census, Cofield had a population of 267.

== History ==
Deane House was listed on the National Register of Historic Places in 1982.

== Geography ==
According to the United States Census Bureau, the village has a total area of 3.1 square miles (8.0 km^{2}), all land.

== Demographics ==
Historical population
| Census | Pop. | Note | %± |
|---|---|---|---|
| 1970 | 318 | | — |
| 1980 | 465 | | 46.2% |
| 1990 | 407 | | −12.5% |
| 2000 | 347 | | −14.7% |
| 2010 | 413 | | 19.0% |
| 2020 | 267 | | −35.4% |
U.S. Decennial Census

=== Racial and ethnic composition ===
Cofield village, North Carolina – Racial and ethnic composition Note: the US Census treats Hispanic/Latino as an ethnic category. This table excludes Latinos from the racial categories and assigns them to a separate category. Hispanics/Latinos may be of any race.
| Race / Ethnicity (NH = Non-Hispanic) | Pop 2000 | Pop 2010 | Pop 2020 | % 2000 | % 2010 | % 2020 |
|---|---|---|---|---|---|---|
| White alone (NH) | 43 | 32 | 23 | 12.39% | 7.75% | 8.61% |
| Black or African American alone (NH) | 279 | 339 | 232 | 80.40% | 82.08% | 86.89% |
| Native American or Alaska Native alone (NH) | 11 | 21 | 5 | 3.17% | 5.08% | 1.87% |
| Asian alone (NH) | 0 | 0 | 0 | 0.00% | 0.00% | 0.00% |
| Native Hawaiian or Pacific Islander alone (NH) | 0 | 0 | 0 | 0.00% | 0.00% | 0.00% |
| Other race alone (NH) | 0 | 1 | 0 | 0.00% | 0.24% | 0.00% |
| Mixed race or Multiracial (NH) | 2 | 6 | 2 | 0.58% | 1.45% | 0.75% |
| Hispanic or Latino (any race) | 12 | 14 | 5 | 3.46% | 3.39% | 1.87% |
| Total | 347 | 413 | 267 | 100.00% | 100.00% | 100.00% |

=== 2000 census ===
As of the census of 2000, there were 347 people, 145 households, and 90 families residing in the village. The population density was 111.1 inhabitants per square mile (42.9/km^{2}). There were 168 housing units at an average density of 53.8 per square mile (20.8/km^{2}). The racial makeup of the village was 13.54% White, 80.69% African American, 3.46% Native American, 1.73% from other races, and 0.58% from two or more races. Hispanic or Latino of any race were 3.46% of the population.

There were 145 households, out of which 29.7% had children under the age of 18 living with them, 37.9% were married couples living together, 19.3% had a female householder with no husband present, and 37.9% were non-families. 31.7% of all households were made up of individuals, and 14.5% had someone living alone who was 65 years of age or older. The average household size was 2.39 and the average family size was 2.99.

In the village, the population was spread out, with 23.6% under the age of 18, 7.5% from 18 to 24, 28.2% from 25 to 44, 25.6% from 45 to 64, and 15.0% who were 65 years of age or older. The median age was 40 years. For every 100 females, there were 79.8 males. For every 100 females age 18 and over, there were 81.5 males.

The median income for a household in the village was $18,214, and the median income for a family was $27,969. Males had a median income of $28,250 versus $17,125 for females. The per capita income for the village was $11,810. About 23.8% of families and 26.5% of the population were below the poverty line, including 32.7% of those under age 18 and 33.9% of those age 65 or over.
