= Theodore Dean House =

Historic house in Massachusetts, United States

- U.S. National Register of Historic Places
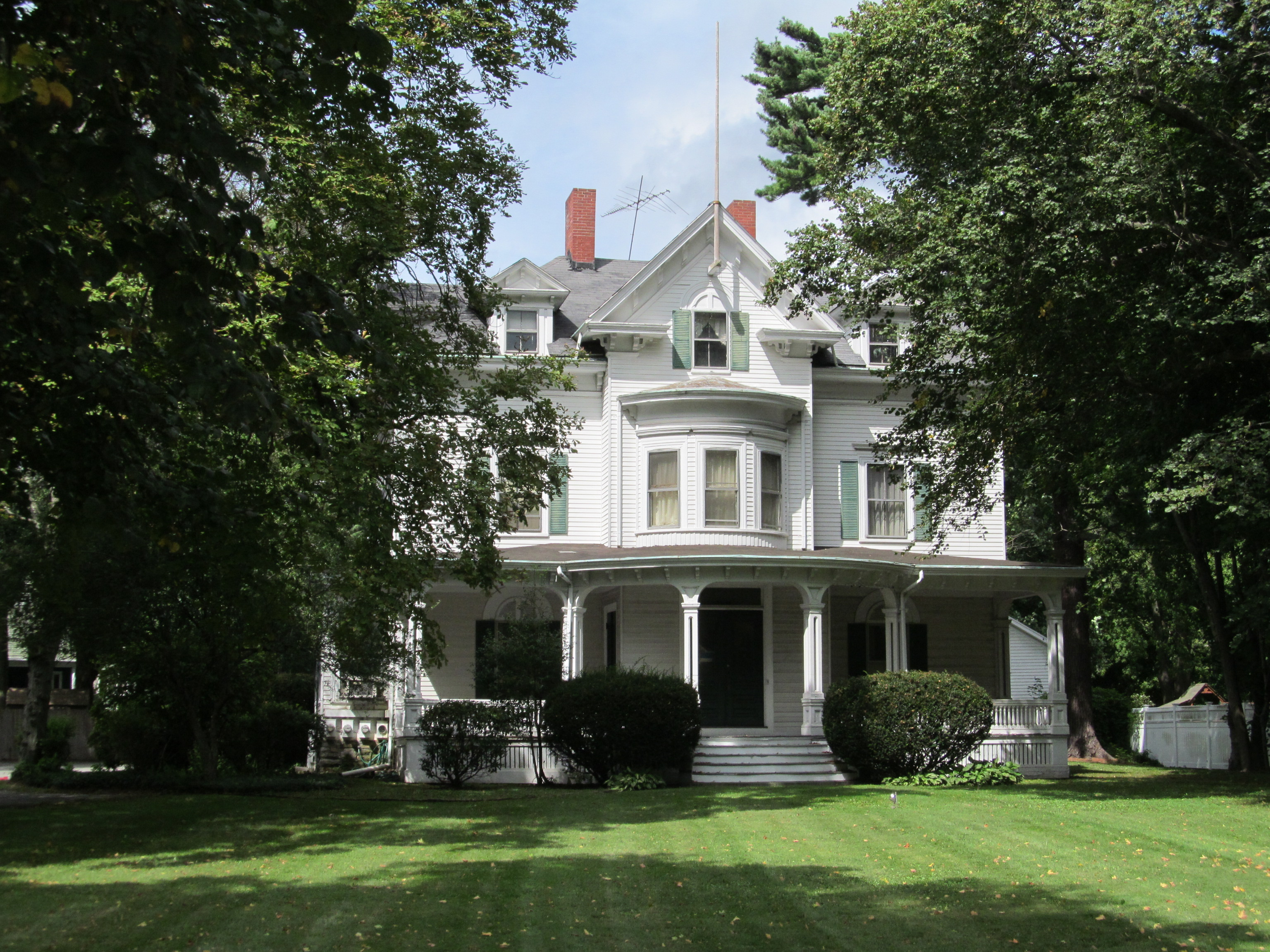
- Theodore Dean House

- Location within Massachusetts Location within the United States
- Location: Taunton, Massachusetts
- Coordinates: 41°54′13″N 71°5′2″W
- Built: 1866
- Architectural style: Italianate
- MPS: Taunton MRA
- NRHP reference No.: 84002108
- Added to NRHP: July 5, 1984

The Theodore Dean House is a historic house located at 26 Dean Street in Taunton, Massachusetts. The 2 1/2-story Italianate style frame house features a central gable pavilion and a front porch carried on chamfered posts. It was built in 1866 for Theodore Dean, who was the last owner of the Taunton Iron Works and president of the Eagle Cotton Mill, and president of a local bank. Dean's family had a long history in the community, establishing the iron works in the 17th century.

The house was added to the National Register of Historic Places in 1984.

== See also ==
- National Register of Historic Places listings in Taunton, Massachusetts
