= Frankie Dean =

Frankie Dean may refer to:

- Franko Fraize, a British rapper from Thetford
- Frankie Osborne, a fictional character on British soap opera Hollyoaks

== See also ==
- Frank Dean (disambiguation)
