= Deane House (Cofield, North Carolina) =

Historic house in North Carolina, United States

- U.S. National Register of Historic Places
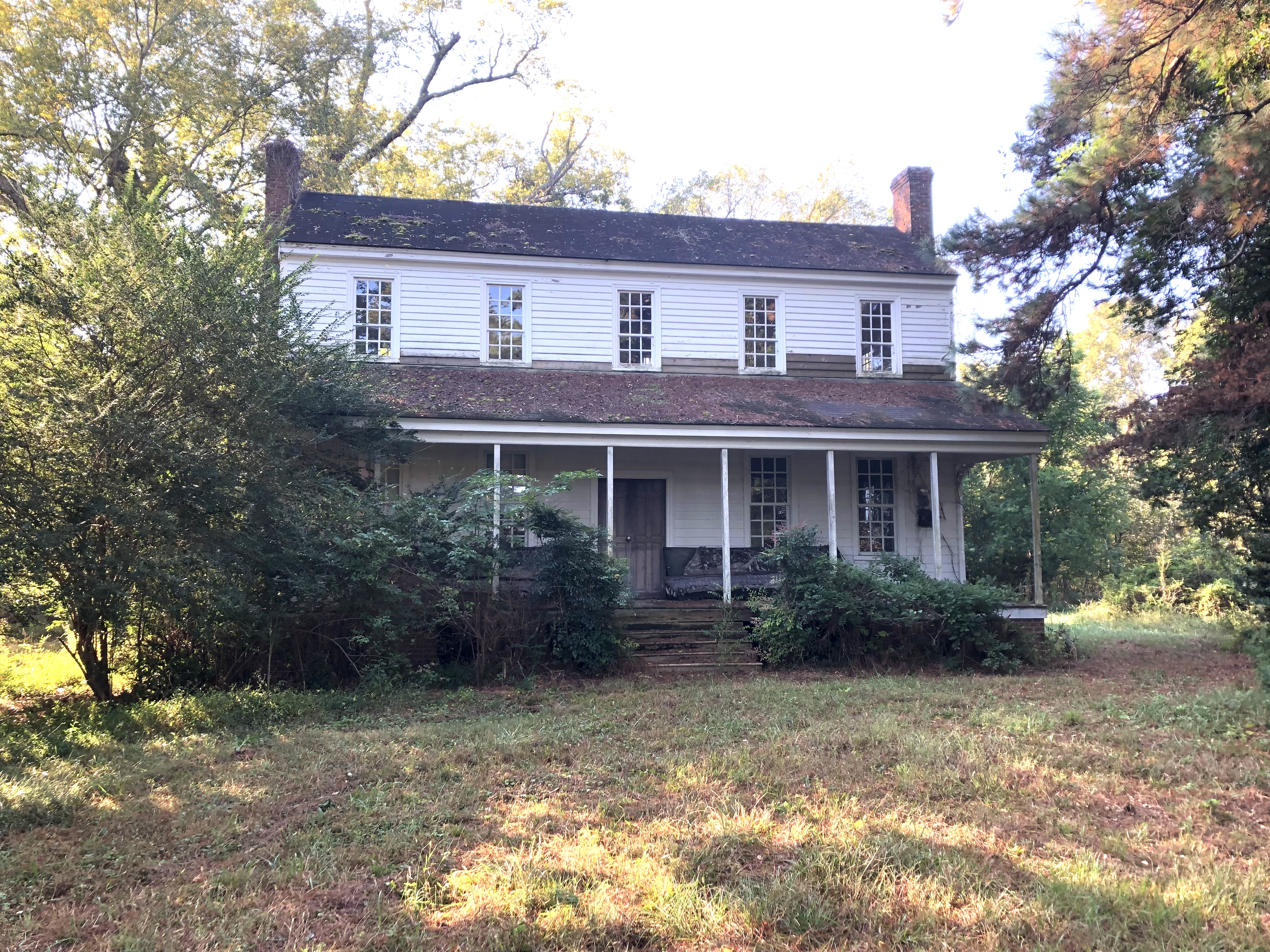

- Location within North Carolina Location within the United States
- Location: Off SR 1446, near Cofield, North Carolina
- Coordinates: 36°19′58″N 76°52′09″W
- Area: 95 acres (38 ha)
- Architectural style: Georgian
- NRHP reference No.: 82003468
- Added to NRHP: April 15, 1982

Deane House, also known as Pritchard Farm, is a historic plantation house and farm located near Cofield, Hertford County, North Carolina. The house is a two-story, five bay Georgian period frame dwelling. It has a shed porch across the front, and a rear ell. Also on the property are the contributing small board-and-batten outbuilding, a large gable-roof outbuilding with additions, three gable-roof barns, and a rectangular well-house.

It was listed on the National Register of Historic Places in 1982.
