= Killing of Danquirs Franklin =

2019 police shooting in North Carolina

- Date: March 25, 2019; 7 years ago
- Location: North Carolina, U.S.
- Type: Homicide by shooting
- Participants: Wende Kerl
- Deaths: 1

On March 25, 2019, 27-year-old Danquirs Franklin was shot and killed by Charlotte-Mecklenburg police officer Wende Kerl.

In the released body-worn camera footage from the confrontation, Franklin appears to have been lowering a gun toward the ground at the time the officer fatally shot him. Kerl was responding to frantic 911 calls about a man with a gun threatening people at a Burger King. The footage shows that Kerl and a male officer instructed Franklin to put the gun down more than 15 times in the roughly 40 seconds before he was shot. The gun is not visible in the video during that timespan. Franklin was shown squatting next to an open car door with another man in the car's passenger seat.

The last command Kerl yells before firing is, “Put it on the ground!” Franklin's right hand slowly appeared as he pulled out a gun by the barrel before he was shot by Kerl twice. Franklin's last words are barely audible, but it appeared that he was saying something to the effect of, "You told me to..." before collapsing.

Franklin's death sparked criticism of the officers' behavior as well as demonstrations following the release of Officer Kerl's bodycam video. The district attorney's office "could not prove to a unanimous jury beyond a reasonable doubt that Officer Kerl's belief that she faced an imminent threat of death of great bodily harm was unreasonable," wrote District Attorney Spencer B. Merriweather in a letter addressed to the Charlotte-Mecklenburg police chief.

In June 2020, Franklin's family filed a lawsuit against the city and Officer Kerl. The lawsuit details the events taking place in Franklin's life leading up to the fatal confrontation. The suit argued he was following the officers’ repeated commands to drop his firearm. Kerl currently works a full-time, non-patrol, investigative role at headquarters.
