= Deane House (Little Rock, Arkansas) =

Historic house in Arkansas, United States

- U.S. National Register of Historic Places
- U.S. Historic district – Contributing property
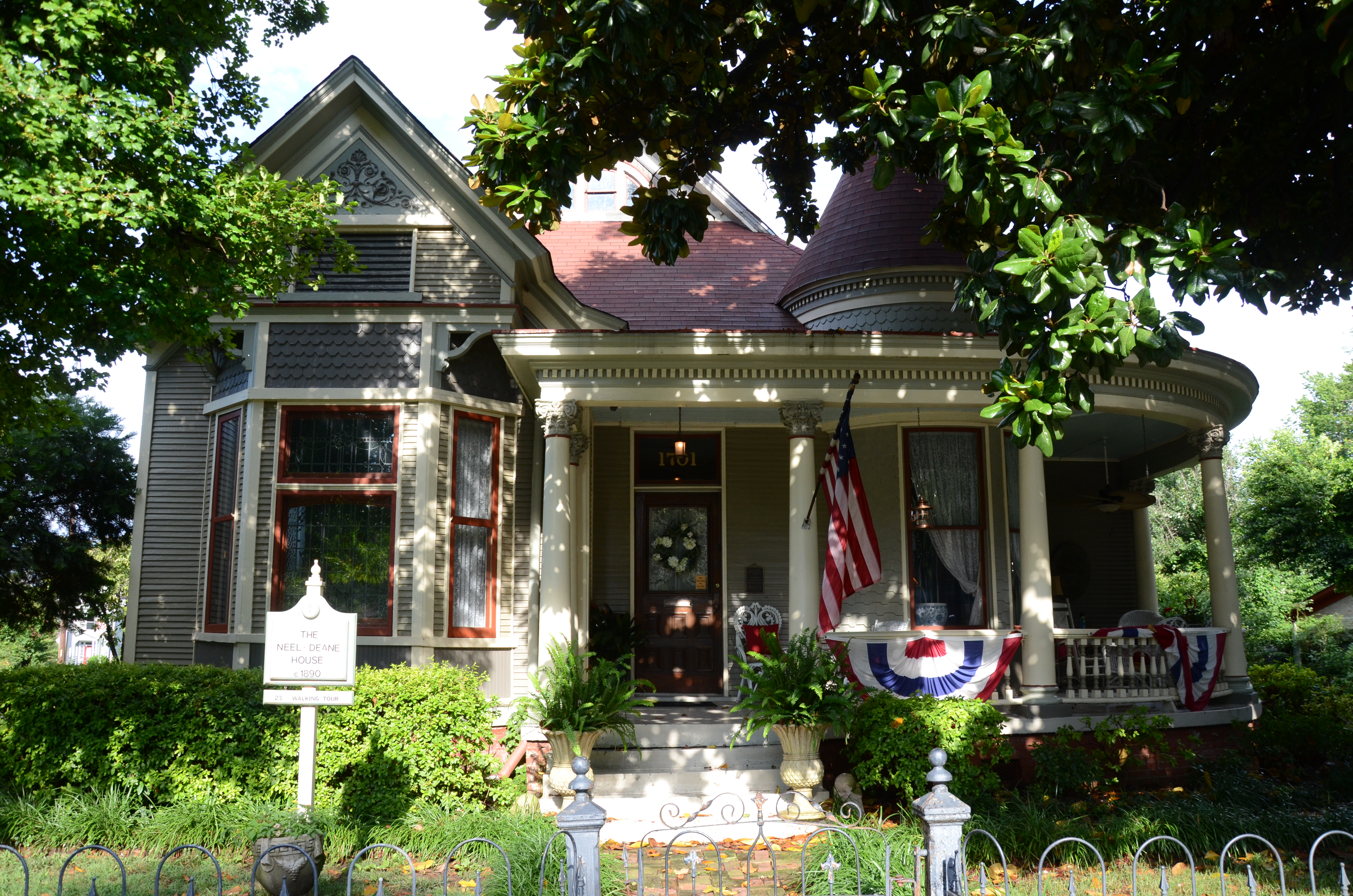

- Location within Arkansas Location within the United States
- Location: 1701 Arch St., Little Rock, Arkansas
- Coordinates: 34°43′59″N 92°16′44″W
- Area: less than one acre
- Built: 1888
- Architectural style: Classical Revival, Queen Anne
- Part of: Governor's Mansion Historic District (ID78000620)
- NRHP reference No.: 75000405

Significant dates
- Added to NRHP: September 5, 1975
- Designated CP: September 13, 1978

The Deane House is a historic house at 1701 Arch Street in Little Rock, Arkansas, United States. It is a 1 1/2-story wood-frame structure, basically rectangular in plan, with gables and projecting sections typical of the Queen Anne style. A single-story turret with conical roof stands at one corner, with a porch wrapping around it. The porch is supported by heavy Colonial Revival Tuscan columns, and has a turned balustrade. The house was probably built about 1888, and is one of the earliest documented examples of this transitional Queen Anne-Colonial Revival style in the city. It was built for Gardiner Andrus Armstrong Deane, a Confederate veteran of the American Civil War, and a leading figure in the development of railroads in the state.

The house was listed on the National Register of Historic Places in 1975.

== See also ==
- National Register of Historic Places listings in Little Rock, Arkansas
