= A. J. Dean House =

Historic house in Montana, United States

- U.S. National Register of Historic Places
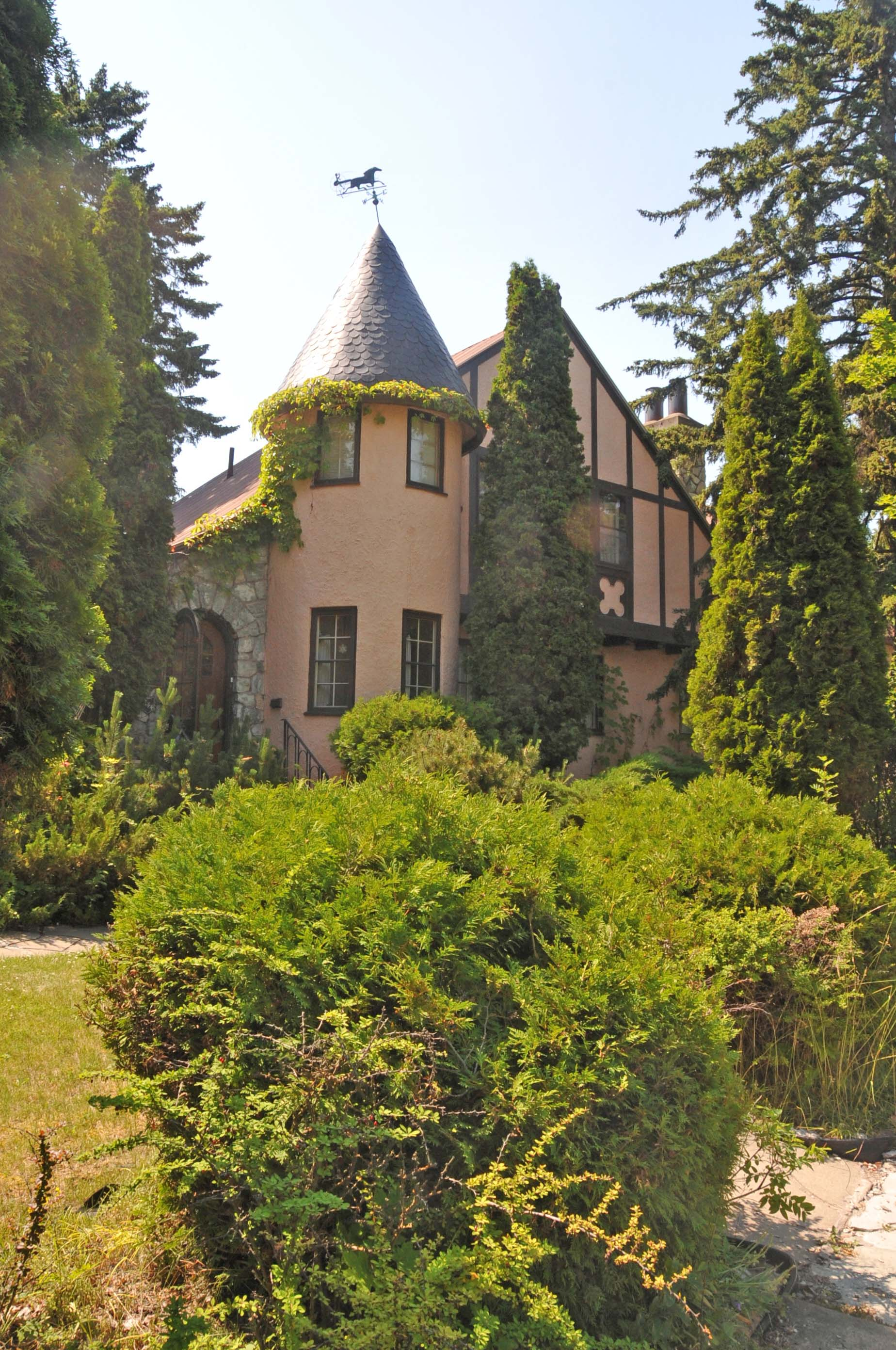

- Location within Montana Location within the United States
- Location: 244 Woodland Avenue, Kalispell, Montana
- Coordinates: 48°11′46″N 114°18′12″W
- Area: 0.8 acres (0.32 ha)
- Built: 1895
- Architectural style: Tudor Revival
- NRHP reference No.: 80002415
- Added to NRHP: August 11, 1980

The A. J. Dean House is a historic house in Kalispell, Montana, U.S.. It was built circa 1895, and designed in the Tudor Revival architecture. It has been listed on the National Register of Historic Places since August 11, 1980.
