= Mary Dean Three-Decker =

- U.S. National Register of Historic Places
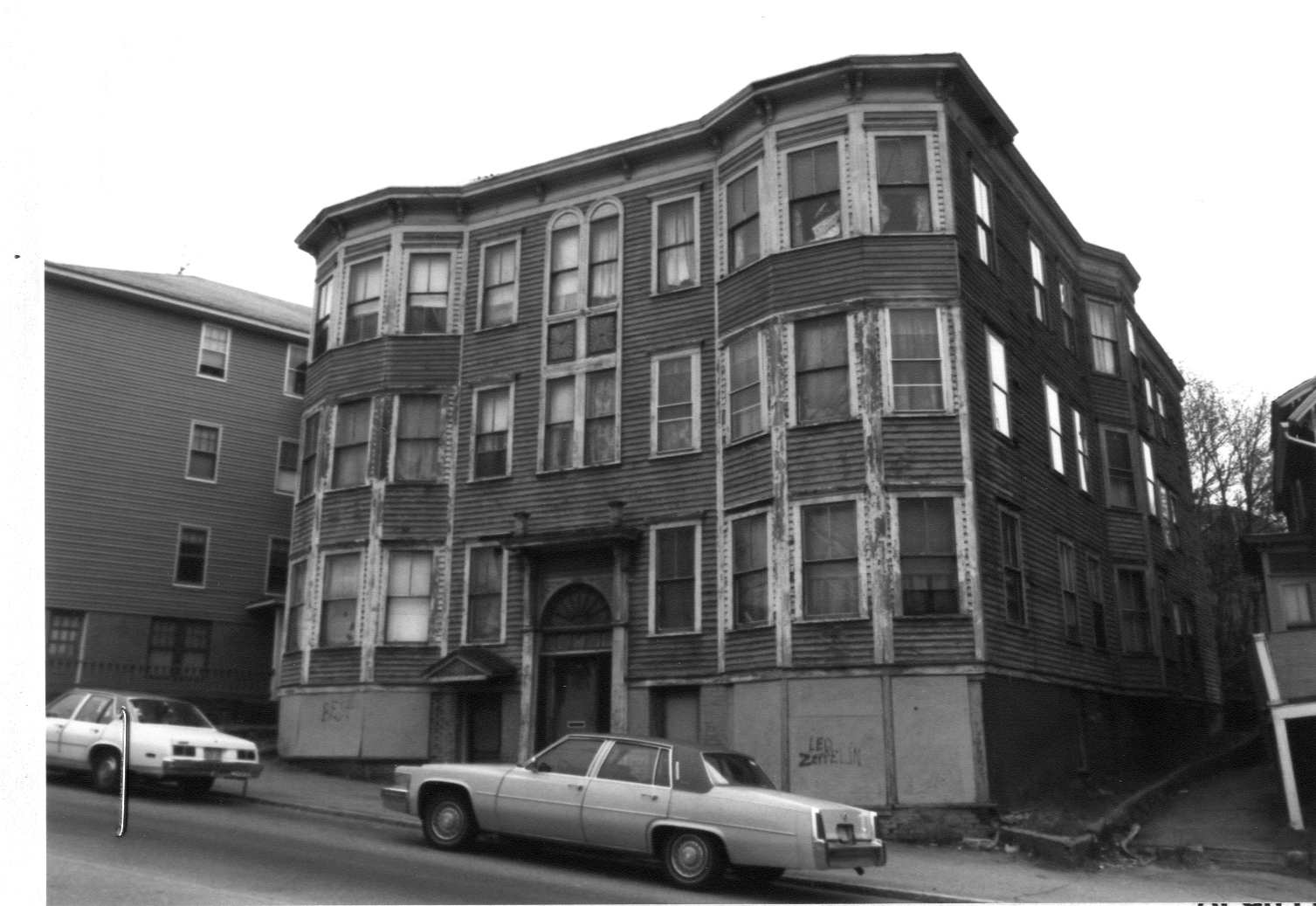
- c. 1981 photo

- Location within Massachusetts Location within the United States
- Location: 130 Belmont St., Worcester, Massachusetts
- Coordinates: 42°16′19″N 71°47′29″W
- Area: less than one acre
- Built: 1892
- Architectural style: Queen Anne
- MPS: Worcester Three-Deckers TR
- NRHP reference No.: 89002390
- Added to NRHP: February 9, 1990

The Mary Dean Three-Decker was a historic triple decker house in Worcester, Massachusetts. Built about 1892, it was a relatively rare surviving 19th century "double" triple-decker that had well-preserved Queen Anne styling. The building was listed on the National Register of Historic Places in 1990. It appears to have been demolished sometime after 1999.

== Description and history ==
The Mary Dean Three-Decker stood in Worcester's Belmont Hill neighborhood, east of downtown, on the south side of Belmont Street (Massachusetts Route 9), opposite the Oakland Place entrance to the UMass Memorial Medical Center. It was a three-story wood frame structure, with its basement partially exposed on the side due to the steeply sloping terrain. It had a roof cornice with paired and single brackets, and a shallow entry portico with a bracketed roof at the center of the street-facing facade. There was a semicircular transom window over the entrance. The entrance was flanked by three-story projecting polygonal window bays

The house was built about 1892, and presented a comparatively stylish facade to busy Belmont Street, then undergoing rapid development to meet demand for worker housing. Mary Dean, the early owner, lived on the premises, and owned other properties nearby on Elizabeth Street. A significant number of early tenants came from Armenia, and included workers in the city's wire works, as well as clerks, bakers, and painters. The building was still standing during a building survey in 1999, but has subsequently been demolished; its site is now a parking lot.

== See also ==
- National Register of Historic Places listings in eastern Worcester, Massachusetts
