= Erastus Dean Farmstead =

- U.S. National Register of Historic Places
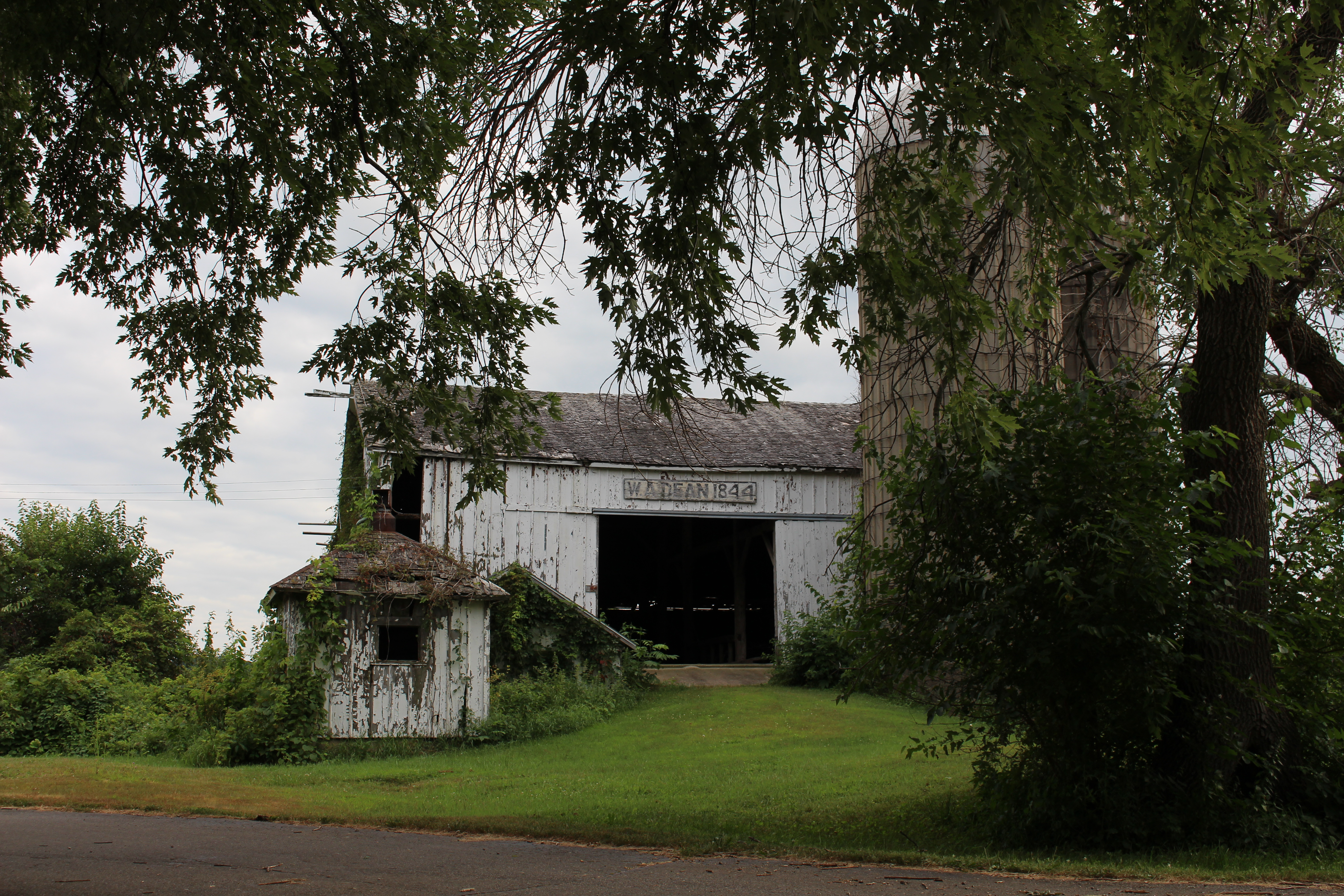
- Erastus Dean Farmstead
- Location: U.S. 14; Bradford, Wisconsin
- Coordinates: 42°39′20″N 88°52′50″W
- Area: 2.5 acres (1.0 ha)
- NRHP reference No.: 78000131
- Added to NRHP: December 4, 1978

The Erastus Dean Farmstead in Bradford, Wisconsin is probably the oldest complex of farm buildings in Rock County, with the house built in 1840 and the barn in 1844. The farm was listed on the National Register of Historic Places in 1978 and on the State Register of Historic Places in 1989.

Erastus Dean came to Emerald Grove from Vermont in the winter of 1837-1838 after an early career which included mission work among the Cherokees in Tennessee. He was the first settler in Bradford township. About 1840 he began to build the house that still stands. He built a store in Emerald Grove and eventually bought 1,000 acres from the government at $1.25 per acre.

Erastus built the first 24x24 foot section of the house from oak logs he cut nearby and squared to six by eight inch timbers, according to his grandson William Allen Dean. He clad the house in siding sawed in Milwaukee, which was the nearest sawmill at that time, and built the 14x24-foot limestone addition soon after. The resulting structure is 1.5 stories, with a saltbox profile, unadorned. Three families lived in the house the first winter, school was taught in one room, and the house hosted the first church services in the area. The grandson heard that an Indian trail ran through the yard and passing Indians sometimes slept on the floor in the house.

About 1844 the main barn was added, 60x64 feet, framed with hand-squared timbers, with space for horses and cattle below and a hay mow above. East of the main barn is a tobacco barn, 63x42 feet, built in the 1800s. East of that is a horse or sheep barn and other structures.
