= Dean-Barstow House =

Historic house in Massachusetts, United States

- U.S. National Register of Historic Places
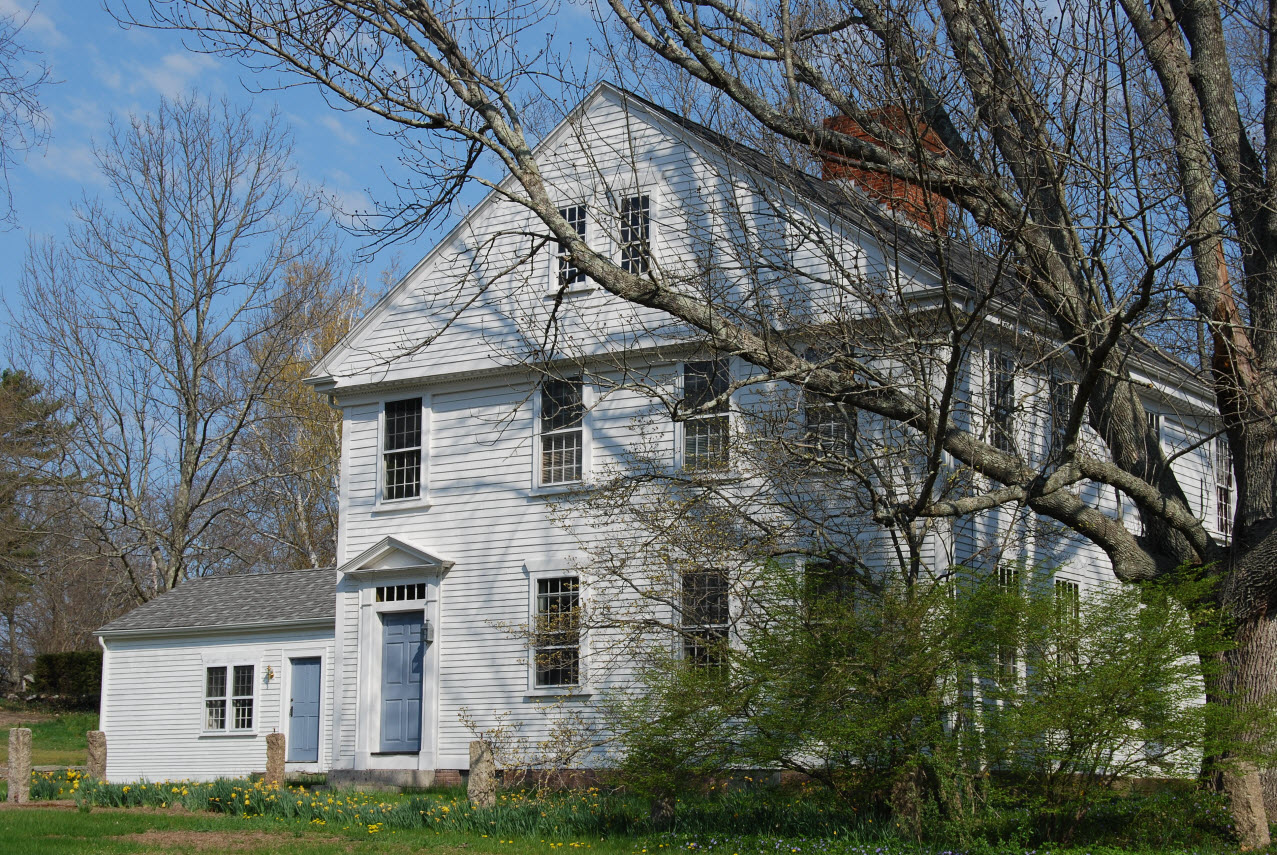

- Location within Massachusetts Location within the United States
- Location: Taunton, Massachusetts
- Coordinates: 41°52′58″N 71°2′58″W
- Built: 1870
- Architectural style: Georgian
- MPS: Taunton MRA
- NRHP reference No.: 84002109
- Added to NRHP: July 5, 1984

The Dean-Barstow House is a historic house located at 275 Williams Street in Taunton, Massachusetts. It was built circa 1810 for Joseph Dean. The house was constructed from lumber planned and finished at Dean's sawmill located nearby.

Joseph Dean, a descendant of Walter Dean, one of Taunton's first settlers, was a prosperous farmer and landowner known for his service in the American Revolution and also as a commander during Shays' Rebellion in 1786.

The house features a central chimney and gabled eaves and is typical of early 18th century New England vernacular construction, although it was built during the Federal Period. It was added to the National Register of Historic Places in 1984.

== See also ==
- National Register of Historic Places listings in Taunton, Massachusetts
