= Deane-Williams House =

Historic house in Massachusetts, United States

- U.S. National Register of Historic Places
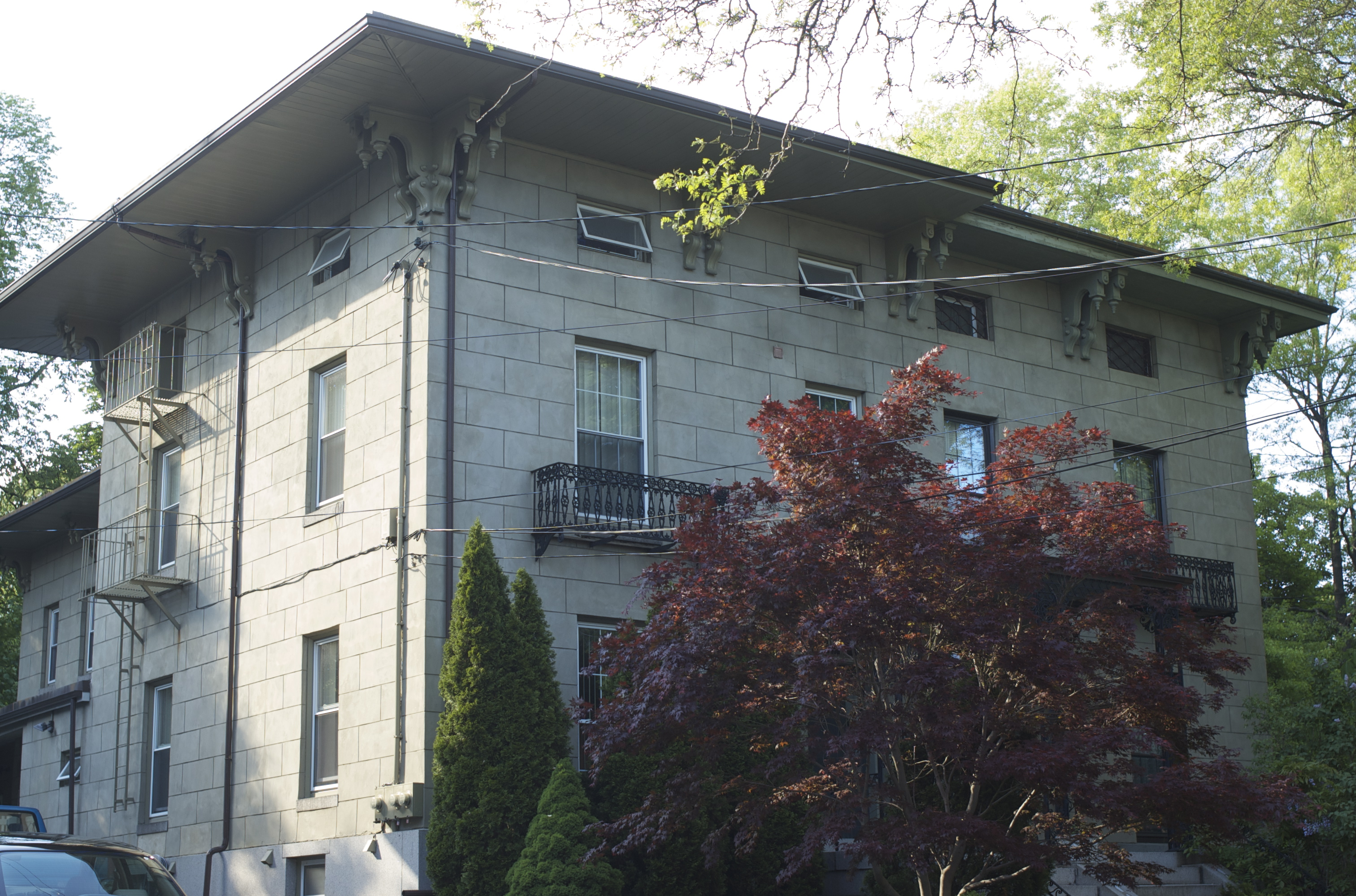

- Location within Massachusetts Location within the United States
- Location: 21–23 Fayette Street, Cambridge, Massachusetts
- Coordinates: 42°22′20.0″N 71°06′13.6″W
- Area: less than one acre
- Built: 1848
- Architectural style: Italianate
- MPS: Cambridge MRA
- NRHP reference No.: 82001936
- Added to NRHP: April 13, 1982

The Deane-Williams House is a historic house in Cambridge, Massachusetts. This two-story brick house was built in 1848 and is of an extremely unusual Italianate style. The overhang of its roof is deep, even for that style, and is studded with large, paired brackets. The house is stuccoed, and at one time the stucco was incised to resemble ashlar stone. Its porches and balconies have ironwork railings that are unique in the city.

The house was listed on the National Register of Historic Places in 1982.

== See also ==
- National Register of Historic Places listings in Cambridge, Massachusetts
