= Jonathan Dean House =

Historic house in Massachusetts, United States

- U.S. National Register of Historic Places
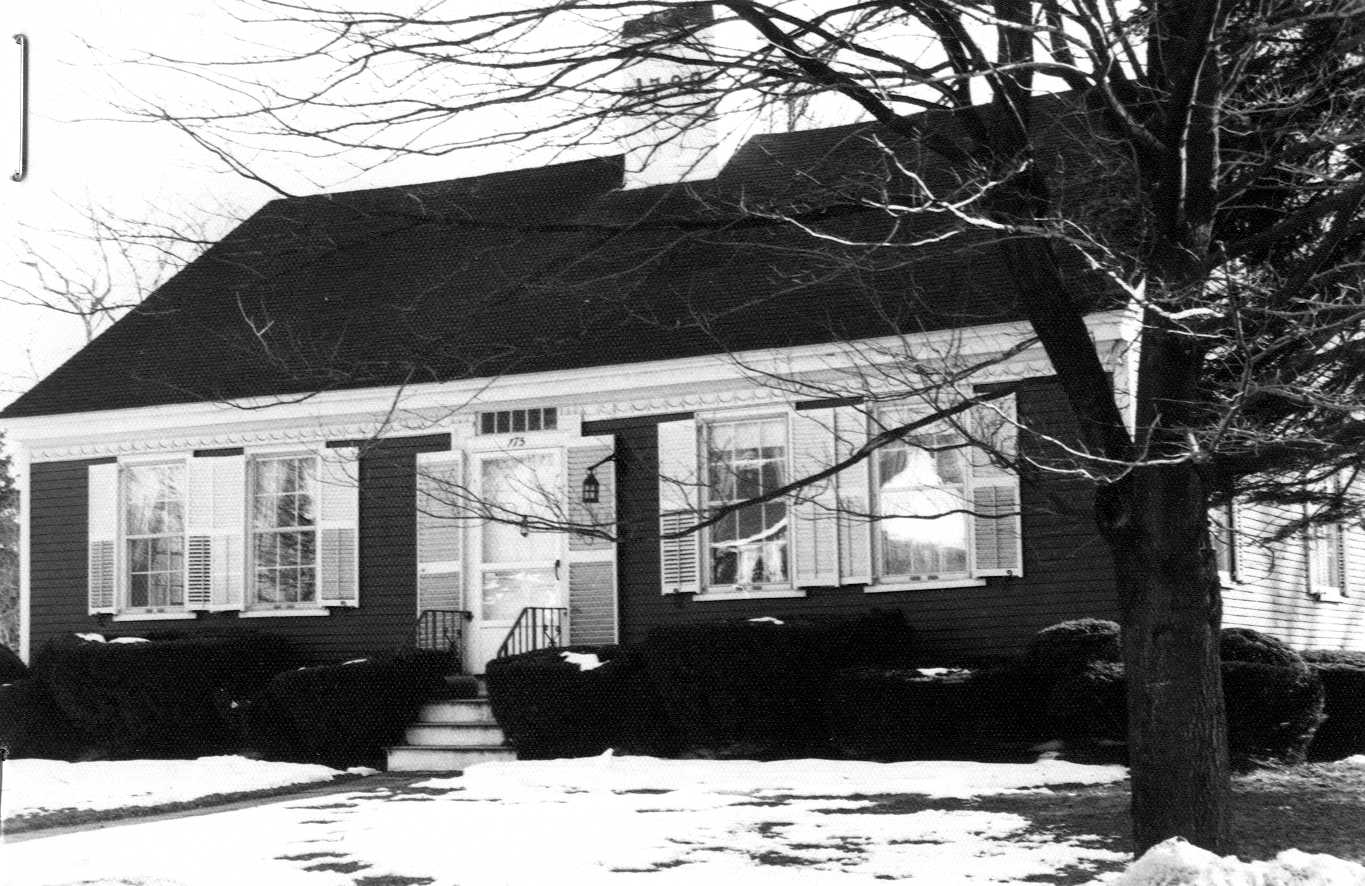
- c. 1979 photo

- Location within Massachusetts Location within the United States
- Location: 175 Dean St., Taunton, Massachusetts
- Coordinates: 41°54′23″N 71°4′4″W
- Built: 1766
- Architectural style: Federal
- MPS: Taunton MRA
- NRHP reference No.: 84002106
- Added to NRHP: July 5, 1984

The Jonathan Dean House was a historic colonial American house located at 175 Dean Street in Taunton, Massachusetts, near the Raynham town line. It was a 1 1/2-story Cape style house, five bays wide, whose entry was flanked by fluted pilasters, and cornice had a festooned frieze. It was built in 1766 and added to the National Register of Historic Places in 1984. At the time, it was considered to be the most highly detailed 18th century house in the city. However, the house was demolished in the mid-1990s for a pharmacy (now Rite Aid).

== See also ==
- National Register of Historic Places listings in Taunton, Massachusetts
