= Frank L. and Mabel H. Dean House =

Historic house in Massachusetts, United States

- U.S. National Register of Historic Places
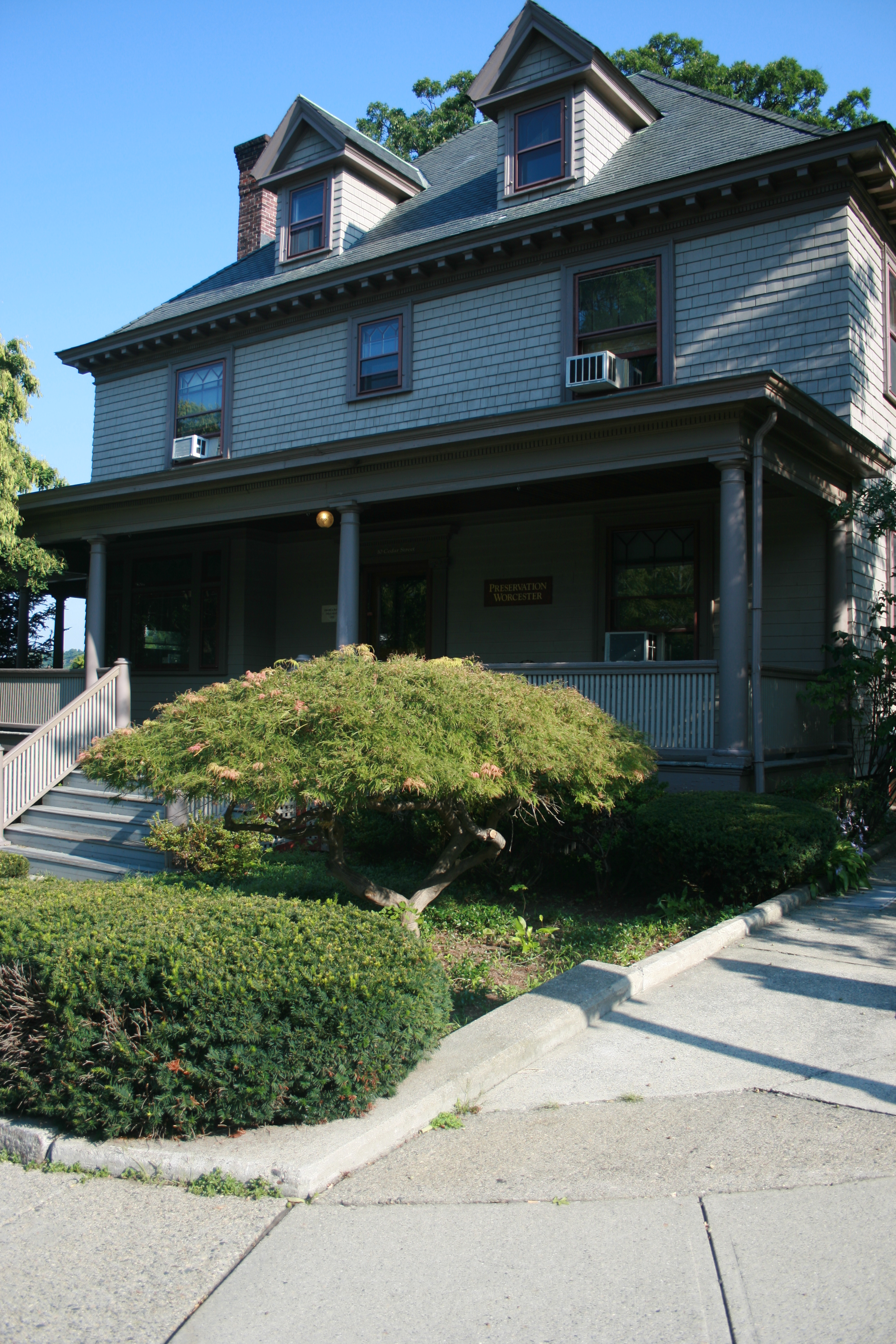

- Location within Massachusetts Location within the United States
- Location: 10 Cedar St., Worcester, Massachusetts
- Coordinates: 42°15′59″N 71°47′48″W
- Area: less than one acre
- Built: 1901
- Architect: Moore, Frank A.; Putnam, Willis E.,
- Architectural style: Colonial Revival
- NRHP reference No.: 02001471
- Added to NRHP: December 05, 2002

The Frank L. and Mabel H. Dean House is an historic house at 10 Cedar Street in Worcester, Massachusetts. Built in 1901 for a prominent lawyer and politician, it is a well-preserved example of period Colonial Revival architecture, with rare period handpainted wall murals. The house was listed on the National Register of Historic Places in 2002.

== Description and history ==
The Dean House stands in a formerly residential area a short way northwest of downtown Worcester, at the northwest corner of Linden and Cedar Streets. It is generally surrounded by parking lots. It is a 2 1/2-story wood-frame structure, with a hip roof and clapboarded exterior. It is three bays wide and four deep, with a rear ell that is one bay wide and one bay deep. A two-bay, two-story pavilion projects from the east side of the main body of the house. The house is topped by a high hipped roof with embedded gable dormers; the edges of the roof are flared in a graceful curve. The eaves and raking sections of the roof are trimmed with modillion brackets, below which are a band of dentil molding and a narrow frieze. The interior of the house is elaborately trimmed in wood, and many of the downstairs rooms are decorated with wall murals.

The house was built in 1901 for Frank L. Dean, a prominent lawyer and Republican politician. The house was built next door to a fine Second Empire house (now demolished), and not far from the childhood home of Dean's wife, Mabel Houghton. Frank Dean served one term as mayor of Worcester in 1903, and then as the personal secretary to Governos Curtis Guild Jr. and Eben Draper. Mabel Houghton Dean was a member of the Worcester Women's Club, an exclusive social and philanthropic organization. Their house is a good example of a generously scaled American Foursquare with Colonial Revival features.

== See also ==
- National Register of Historic Places listings in northwestern Worcester, Massachusetts
- National Register of Historic Places listings in Worcester County, Massachusetts
