= Old Weir Stove Building =

- Old Weir Stove Company
- U.S. National Register of Historic Places
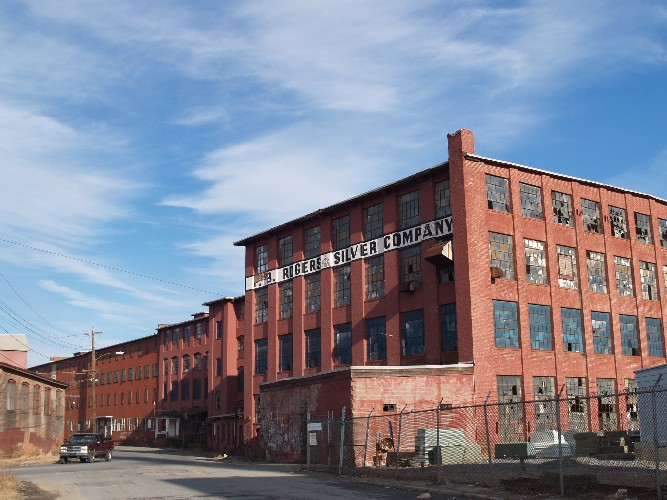
- former Weir Stove Company / F.B. Rogers Silver Co.

- Location within Massachusetts Location within the United States
- Location: Taunton, Massachusetts
- Coordinates: 41°52′57″N 71°5′34″W
- Area: 3 acres (1.2 ha)
- Built: 1902
- MPS: Taunton MRA
- NRHP reference No.: 84002194
- Added to NRHP: July 5, 1984

The Old Weir Stove Company was an historic industrial facility located on West Water Street in Weir Village, Taunton, Massachusetts. The factory consisted of a series of connected brick buildings, located between West Water Street and the west bank of the Taunton River. The factory was built in 1902 and added to the National Register of Historic Places in 1984. It was later occupied by F.B. Rogers Silver Company. In May–June 2009, the site was demolished, except for the northernmost building of the complex.

The Weir Stove Company was originally located on the west side of West Water Street, but expanded to this site in 1902. The company was later known as the Glenwood Stove Company. The company produced a stove called the "Glenwood Range", and contributed to the city's prominence as a leading center of stove manufacturing. The buildings were built using fairly typical period mill construction and styling, with load-bearing brick walls, low-pitch gable roofs, and arched paired windows. The complex was the largest and most impressive in the Weir Village area.

== See also ==
- National Register of Historic Places listings in Taunton, Massachusetts
