= Weir Engine House =

- U.S. National Register of Historic Places
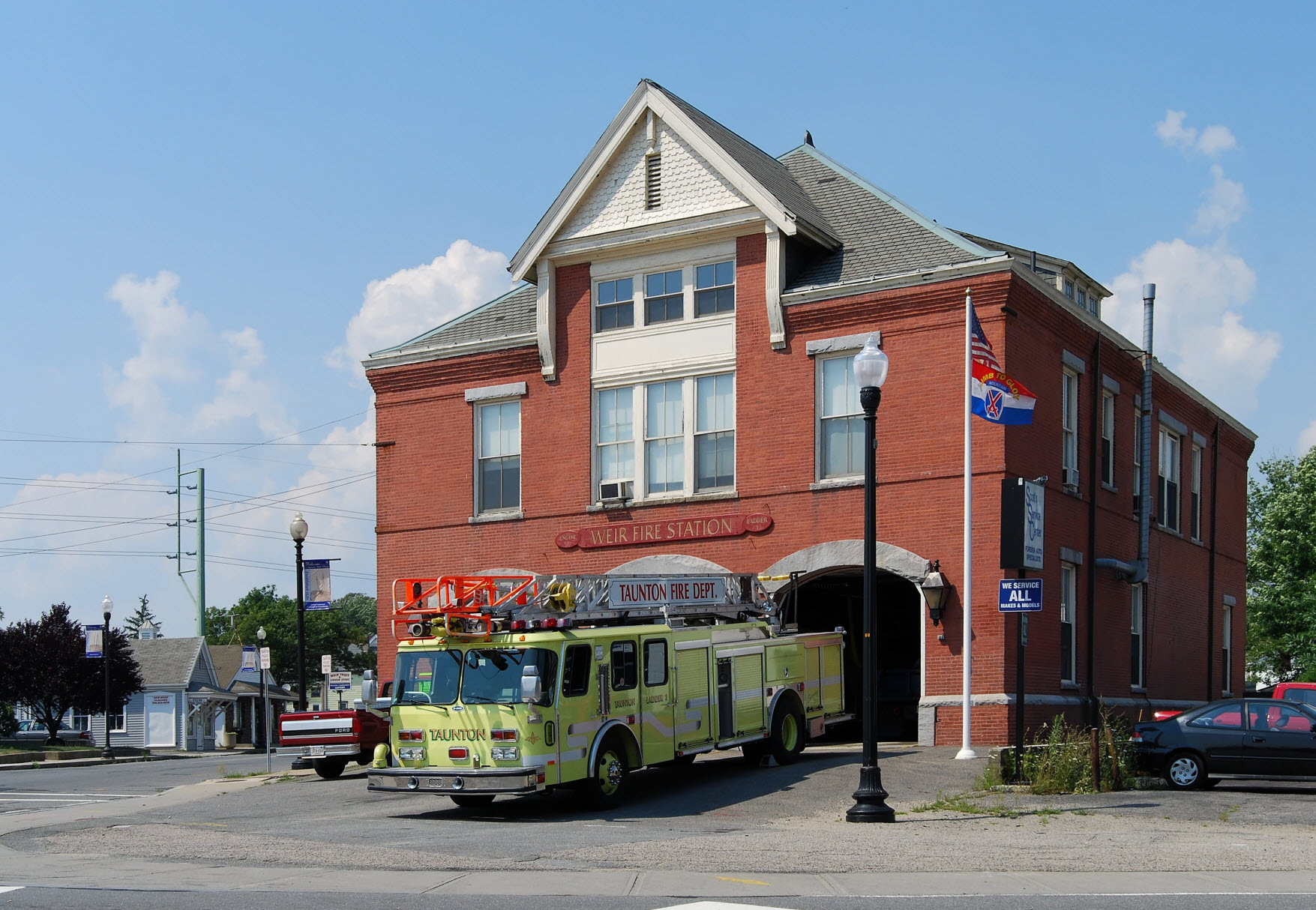

- Location within Massachusetts Location within the United States
- Location: Taunton, Massachusetts
- Coordinates: 41°53′15″N 71°5′23″W
- Built: 1889
- Architect: Coleman, Abner
- Architectural style: Queen Anne
- MPS: Taunton MRA
- NRHP reference No.: 84002263
- Added to NRHP: July 5, 1984

The Weir Engine House is a historic fire station located at 530 Weir Street in Taunton, Massachusetts. It was built in 1889 and added to the National Register of Historic Places in 1984. It is one of two stations in the city, along with the Whittenton Fire and Police Station designed by Taunton's second fire chief, Abner Coleman. It was built by contractor James T. Bassett.

The building is a 2-1/2 story brick structure, with a rear ell and a hose-drying tower. It is covered by a hip roof with large central gabled wall dormer at the front. The station has three equipment bays with segmented-arch granite lintels. Above the outer bays are single sash windows with granite sills and lintels. The second-story central bay has a group of three sash windows, above which, in the gable, are three similar but truncated windows, with a field of scalloped wood shingles above. The building's design is similar to that of the Whittenton Station, which was built at the same time.

The station houses the city's Engine 3, weir police precinct, and a community police substation. In addition to both the fire and police quarters, the station formerly included a neighborhood library. The Weir Engine house is one of four 19th-century fire stations still in use by the City of Taunton Fire Department, along with Central, Whittenton and East Taunton.

== See also ==
- National Register of Historic Places listings in Taunton, Massachusetts
- Taunton Fire Department
- Weir Village, Massachusetts
