= Whittenton Fire and Police Station =

- U.S. National Register of Historic Places
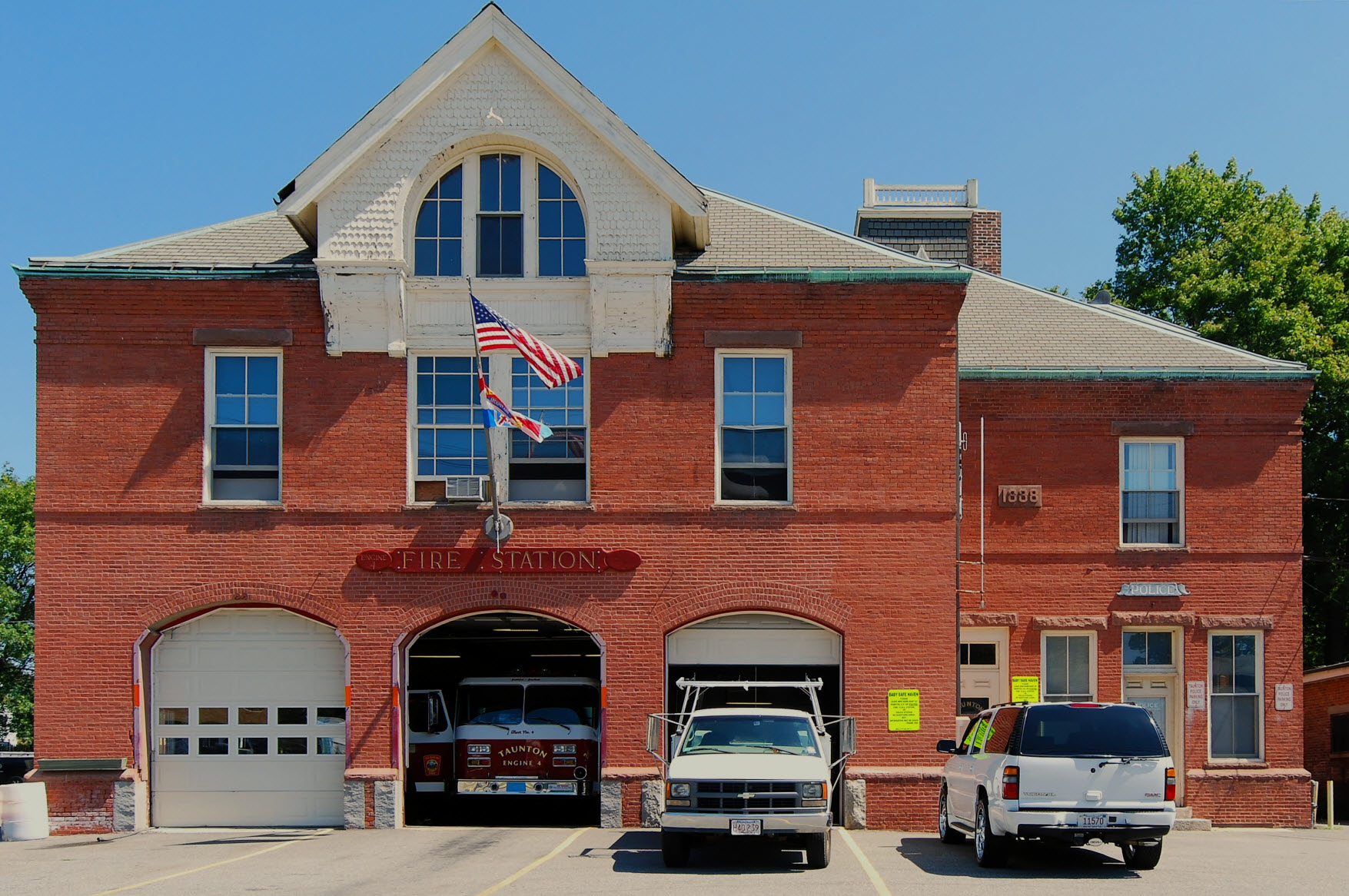

- Location within Massachusetts Location within the United States
- Location: Taunton, Massachusetts
- Coordinates: 41°55′14″N 71°5′49″W
- Built: 1888
- Architect: Abner Coleman; James T. Bassett (builder)
- Architectural style: Queen Anne
- MPS: Taunton MRA
- NRHP reference No.: 84002271
- Added to NRHP: July 5, 1984

The Whittenton Fire and Police Station is a historic fire station and police station located on Bay Street in Taunton, Massachusetts. Built in 1888, it is one of only two surviving 19th-century Queen Anne-style fire stations in the city. It was listed on the National Register of Historic Places in 1984.

== Description and history ==
The Whittenton Station is located on the east side of Bay Street, a major north-south artery leading north from downtown Taunton, and just north of its junction with East Britannia Street. It is a brick structure whose main block is 2-1/2 stories in height, topped by a hip roof with a large central gable-roofed projecting dormer. A two-story ell projects to the right at a recess, with a three-story hose drying tower behind. The main block houses three equipment bays behind segmented-arch openings, with four sash windows in a 1-2-1 pattern above. The dormer is framed in wood and finished in decorative cut shingles, with large scroll brackets on either side of a round arch in which a three-part window is set. The side section has two pedestrian entrances, one for the fire station and one for the police station.

The station is one of two in the city designed by its second fire chief, Abner Colemn, and was built in 1888 (the other, the Weir Engine House was built in 1889). It was built by contractor James T. Bassett. It is a fine local example of a municipal Queen Anne structure, built during a period of significant growth in the city.

The station houses Taunton's engine 4, water rescue 1, Whittenton police precinct, and a community police substation. The building previously housed a neighborhood library.

== See also ==
- National Register of Historic Places listings in Taunton, Massachusetts
- Taunton Fire Department
