= Taunton Municipal Lighting Plant =

Municipal electric utility within Taunton, Massachusetts

- Predecessor: Taunton Electric Lighting Company
- Founded: 1897; 129 years ago
- Headquarters: Taunton, Massachusetts, United States
- Area served: Greater Taunton Area
- Website: tmlp.com

The Taunton Municipal Lighting Plant (TMLP) established in 1897, is a municipal electric utility within the city of Taunton, Massachusetts. Prior to 1897, the TMLP was the Taunton Electric Lighting Company, which lit Main Street/City Square area in 1892. It even made it possible to create the first electric car service [similar to trolleys] in the city in 1893. Today, the TMLP offer a wide arrange of services within the Greater Taunton Area, such as lighting services, an internet provider, etc. It's a large and active municipal company in the region.
