= Joseph Willis House =

Historic house in Massachusetts, United States

- U.S. National Register of Historic Places
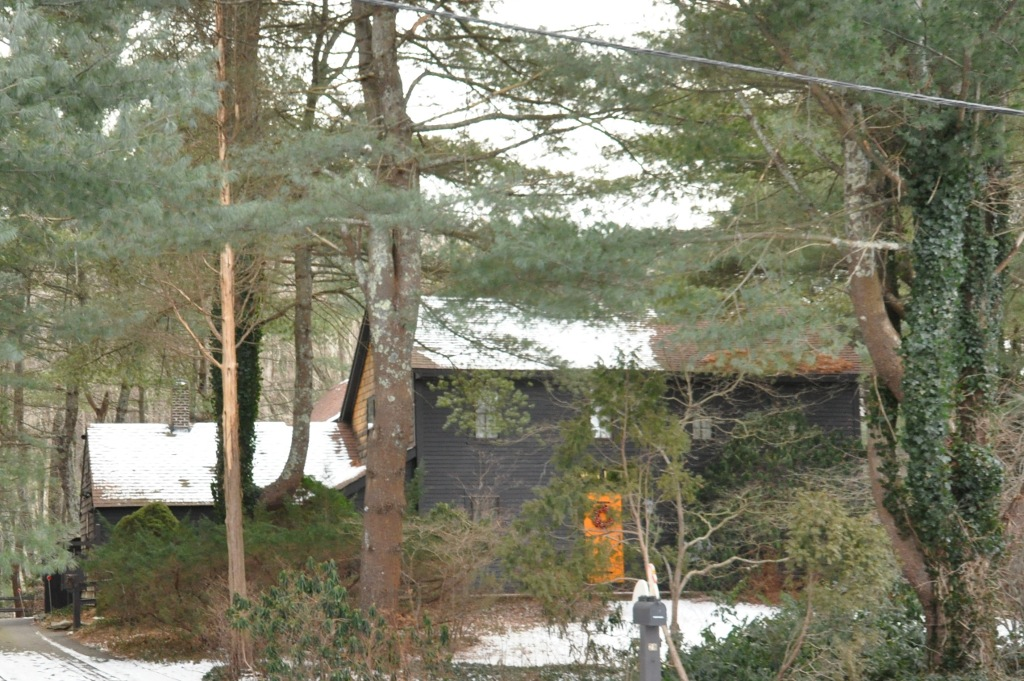

- Location within Massachusetts Location within the United States
- Location: 28 Worcester St., Taunton, Massachusetts
- Coordinates: 41°54′59″N 71°8′51″W
- Built: 1688
- MPS: Taunton MRA
- NRHP reference No.: 84002286
- Added to NRHP: July 5, 1984

The Joseph Willis House is a historic colonial house located at 28 Worcester Street in Taunton, Massachusetts. Built in 1688, it is the city's oldest surviving building, and one of the oldest in the state.

== Description and history ==
The Joseph Willis House is located in a rural residential area of western Taunton, on the southwestern side of the junction of Worcester Street and Alfred Lord Boulevard. It is a 2 1/2-story, timber-framed structure, with a side gable roof that slopes down to the first floor in the rear, giving the house a saltbox profile. Its main facade is four bays wide, with somewhat even placement of sash windows on the second floor, and asymmetrical placement on the first. The entrance is in the second bay from the left, and is framed by pilasters and a transom window. A large chimney projects through the roof at a slightly off-center position that is roughly behind the entrance.

The house's first owner, Joseph Willis was a native of Bridgewater who was granted land in Taunton as a favor for his military service during King Philip's War. He moved to the area in 1670, and built this house in 1688. It was extended by two ells in the 19th century, and its interior was remodeled in the 20th century. It is believed to be the oldest building in Taunton at its original location.

It was listed on the National Register of Historic Places on July 5, 1984.

== See also ==
- National Register of Historic Places listings in Taunton, Massachusetts
- List of the oldest buildings in Massachusetts
