= East Taunton Fire Station =

- U.S. National Register of Historic Places
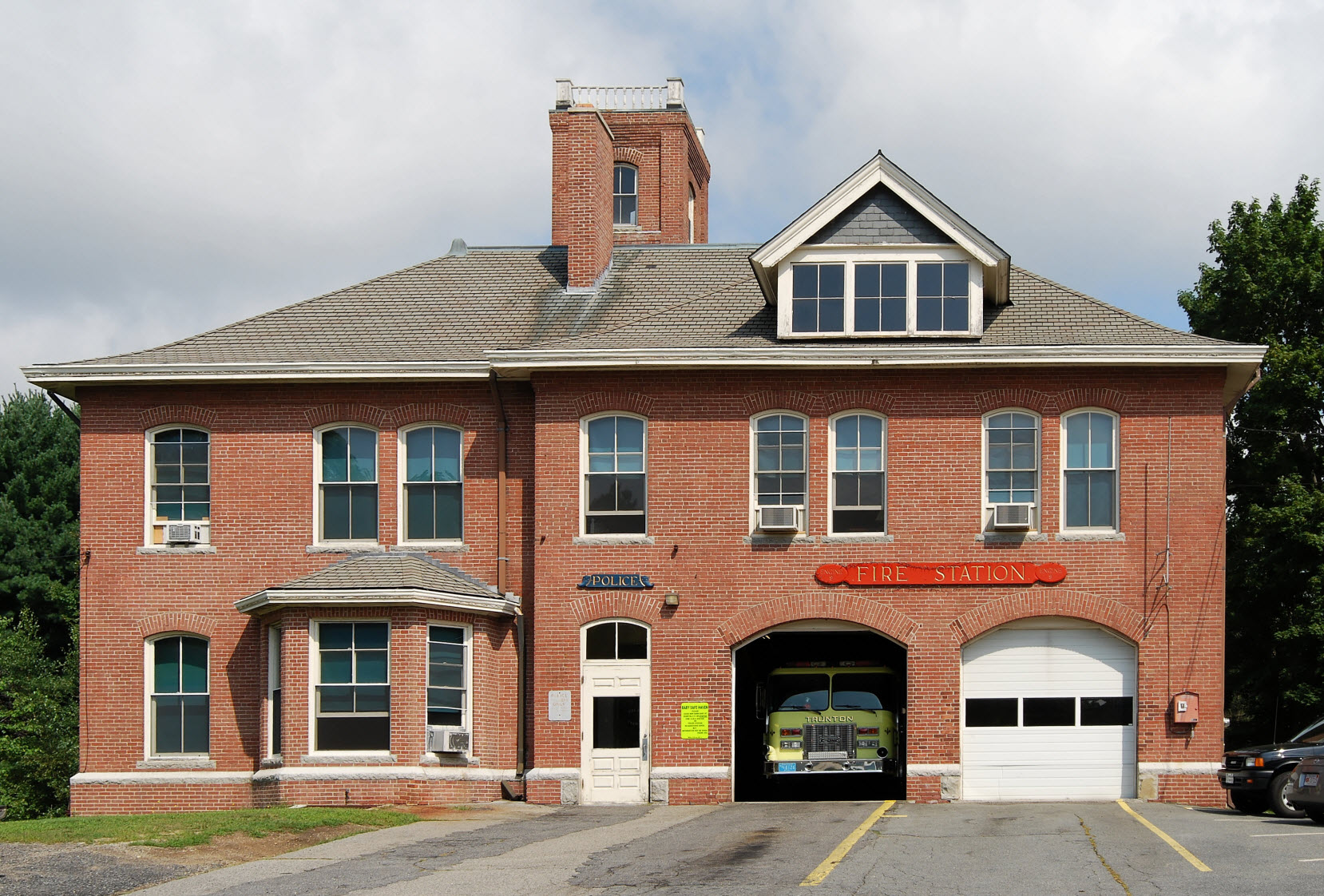

- Location within Massachusetts Location within the United States
- Location: East Taunton, Massachusetts
- Coordinates: 41°52′56″N 71°2′1″W
- Built: 1899
- Architectural style: Colonial Revival, Queen Anne
- MPS: Taunton MRA
- NRHP reference No.: 84002112
- Added to NRHP: July 5, 1984

East Taunton Fire Station is a historic fire station located on Middleboro Avenue in the East Taunton section of Taunton, Massachusetts. It was built in 1899 to replace a rented facility that housed the Old Colony Engine Company. It is a two-story brick building, five bays wide, with a hip roof. The rightmost three bays project forward, with a cross-gable hip roof, with the rightmost bays housing engines, and the left bay of the projection providing the main pedestrian entry. The building was added to the National Register of Historic Places in 1984.

It is still operational, and is occupied by the Taunton Fire Department's Engine 9, Forestry 1, and the Taunton Police "East Taunton Precinct".

== See also ==
- National Register of Historic Places listings in Taunton, Massachusetts
- Taunton Fire Department
