= Poole Silver Company =

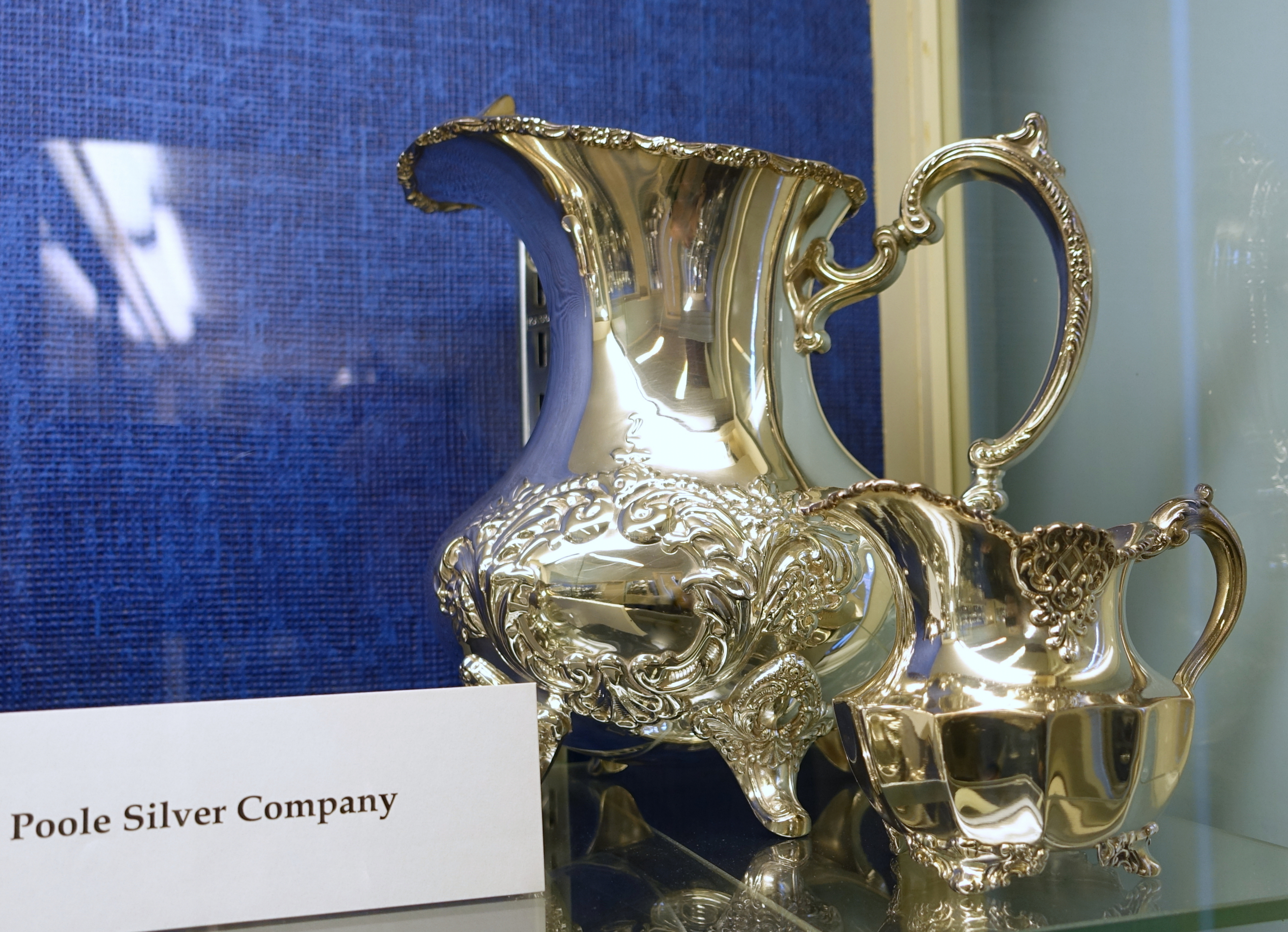
Poole Silver Company exhibit

Poole Silver Company was an American silver manufacturing company, active in Taunton, Massachusetts from 1892 to 1971.

The Poole Silver Company was formed in 1892 by George Poole and Edward Roche in Taunton as Poole, Roche & Co., then established as a corporation on May 21, 1895, as an early manufacturer of silver products made with electroplating techniques. In 1900 it operated in a small two-room factory at 106 Whittenton Street, and later moved to 320 Whittenton Street. From 1946 the firm began to produce sterling silver flatware, holloware, and cutlery. In 1971 the company was bought by Towle Silversmiths. The intellectual property currently belongs to Lifetime Brands.
