= Taunton Silverplate Company =

American manufacturer

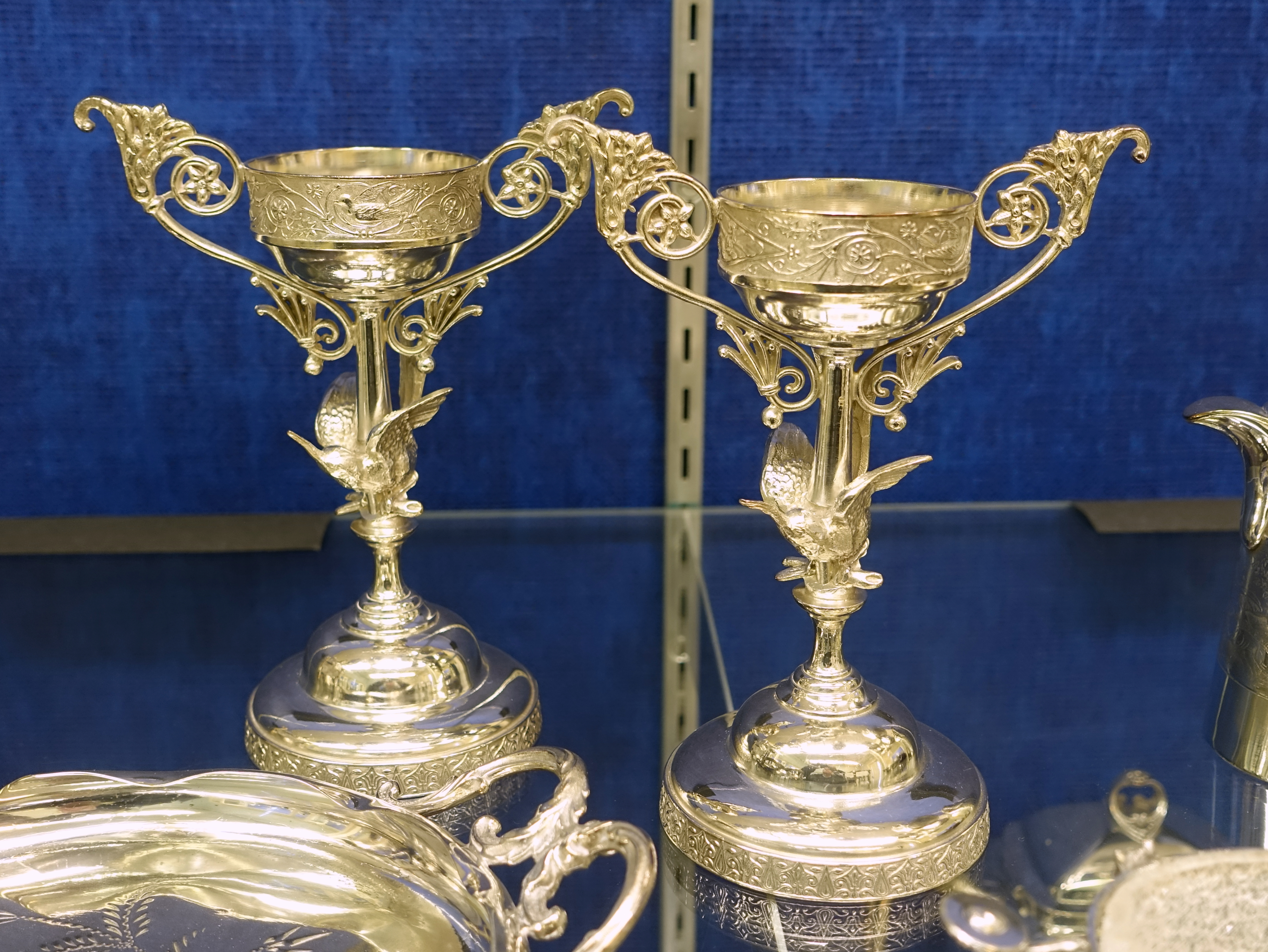
Nut dishes by Taunton Silver Plate Company, c. 1874

The Taunton Silverplate Company, also known as the Taunton Silver Plate Company, was an American manufacturing company active in Taunton, Massachusetts from 1853 to 1859. Some form of the company was reconstituted c. 1872-1874 with its showroom at 4 Maiden Lane, New York City, with Oliver Ames (Note: Both Oliver Ames Jr. (1807-1877) and his nephew Oliver Ames (1831-1895) were active in business around 1872-1874, and it is unclear which one this was.) as president and George T. Atwood as treasurer. The Brooklyn Daily Eagle of December 16, 1874, advertises the firm auctioning off their showroom and all stock. At some point, probably circa 1880, the firm was purchased by I.J. Steane.
