= Weir Village, Massachusetts =

Village in Massachusetts, United States

Coordinates: 41°53′00″N 71°05′08″W

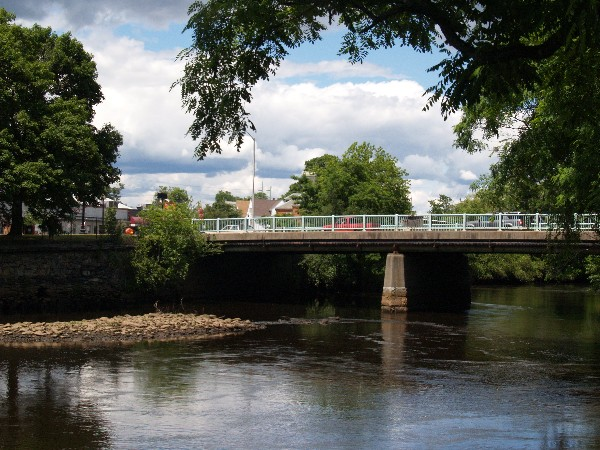
Taunton River at Weir Village

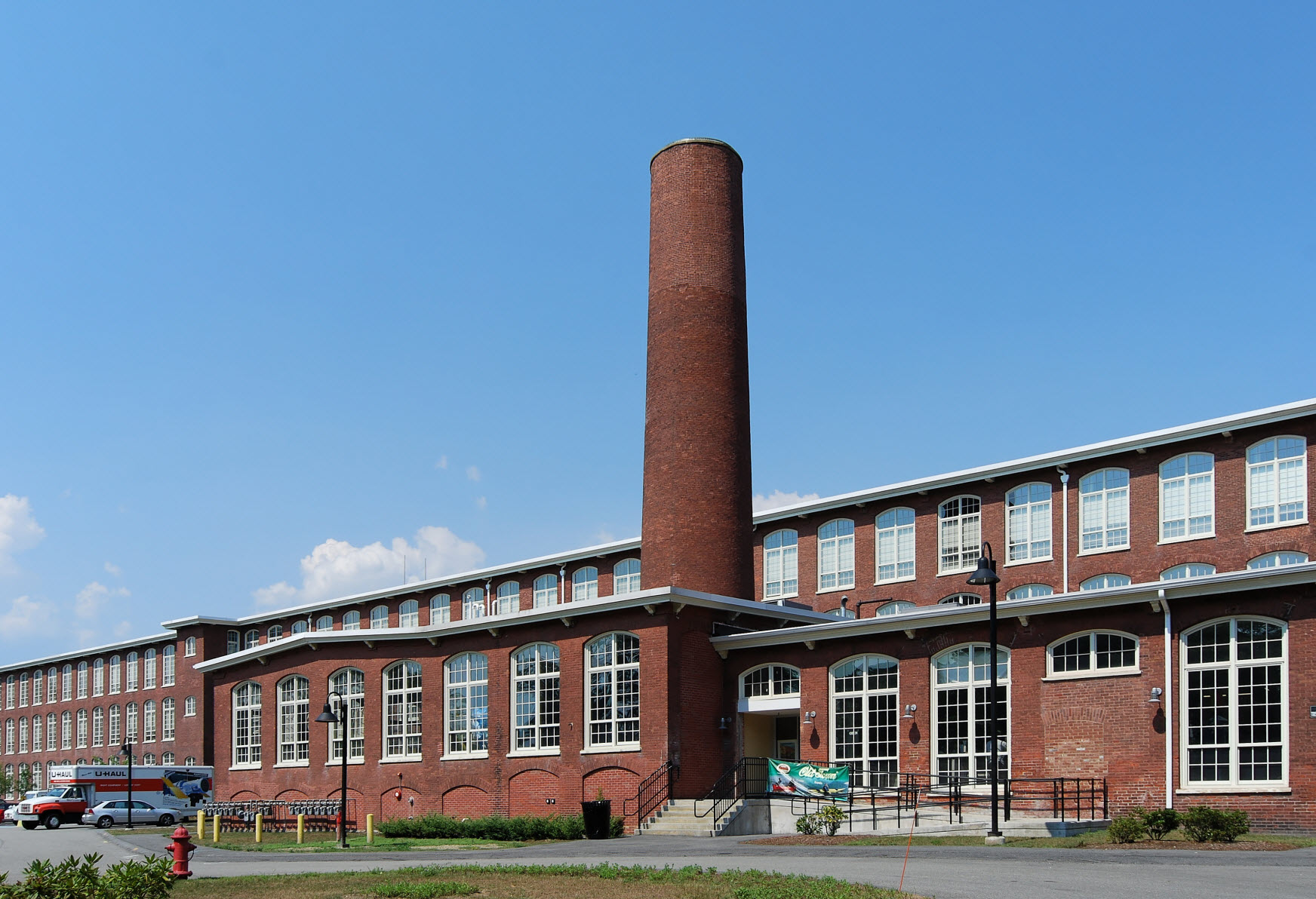
Robertson on the River

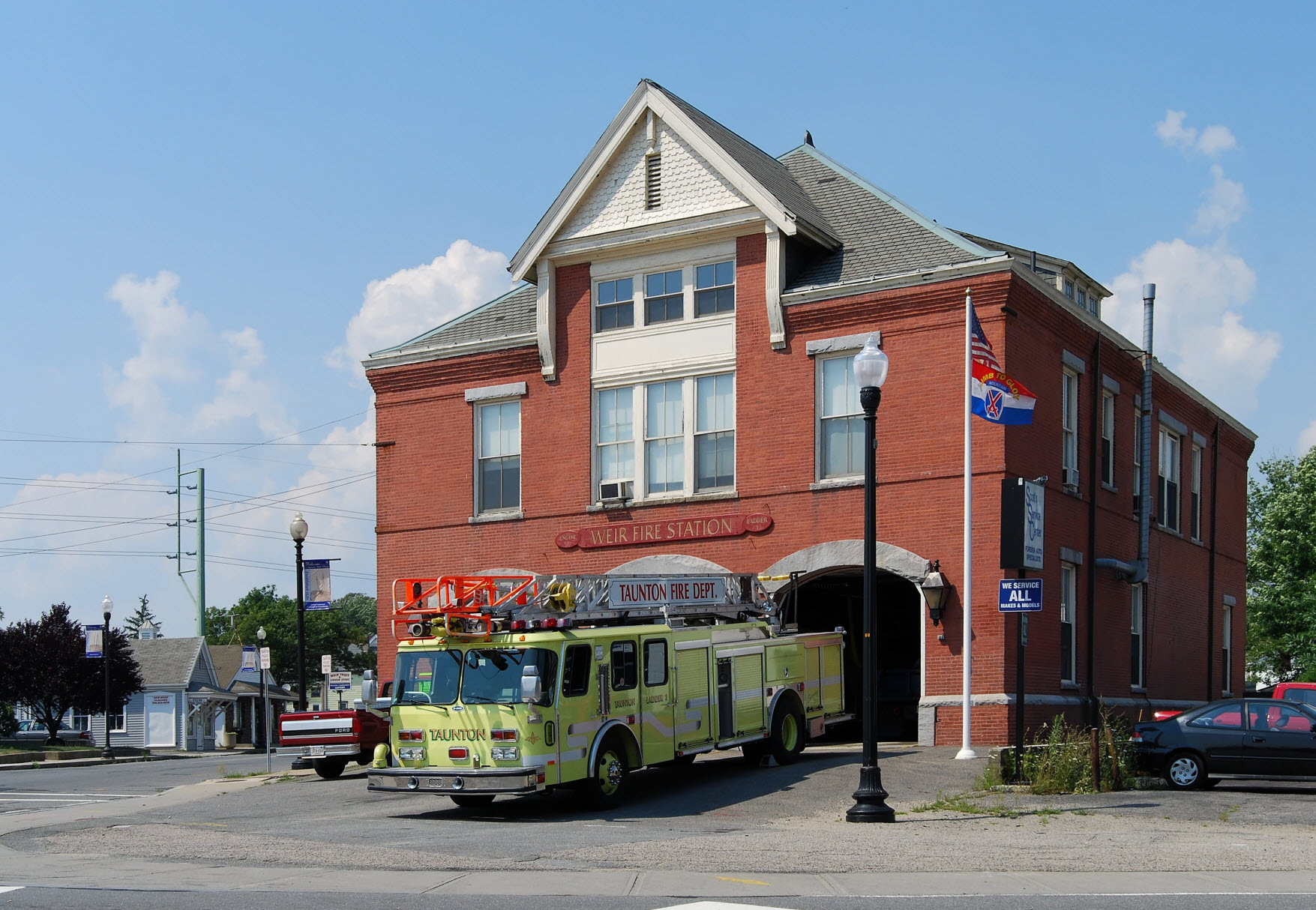
Weir Engine House

Weir Village (also known as "The Weir") is a village of the city of Taunton in Bristol County, Massachusetts, United States, located approximately one mile south of the city center on the banks of the Taunton River, near the point where it becomes tidal. The village takes its name from fishing weirs which were placed across the Taunton River from pre-colonial times until the early 20th century, to catch herring (also known as "alewifes"). While much of the commercial part of the village lies on the west side of the river, along Weir Street, a dense residential area extends in an easterly direction across the river along Plain and Berkley Streets.

== History ==
The Taunton area was called "Cohannet" by the native Wampanoag tribes that inhabited the area before the first English settlers arrived in the early 17th century. The location which would later become Weir Village was used by the natives who erected fishing weirs to catch herring in the Taunton River, which were in great abundance. With increased settlement, the seasonal herring fishing industry became a vital part of the area economy. The early settlers used the fish to fertilize their fields, as well as for food.

A shipbuilding industry developed at Weir Village during the early 19th century. In 1838, the Taunton Branch Railroad began, with a junction at Weir Village just north of Ingell Street. During the late 19th and early 20th centuries, ocean-going vessels would dock at Weir Village and was a vital part of the city of Taunton's economy, which included brickmaking, iron, textiles and machinery. Weir Village was also an important early transport hub for grain leaving the interior areas of southeastern Massachusetts for export.

The Old Weir Stove Company was located on West Water Street, just south of the village center. It was the long-time maker of the well-known Glenwood cooking stove. Part of the stove company complex was later occupied by the F.B. Rogers Silver Company, located directly on the west bank of the Taunton River (demolished in 2009). The Bacon Felt Company was also located on West Water Street. The former Taunton Municipal Lighting Plant is located further south, with its tall, twin smokestacks visible from many surrounding areas.

== Today ==
In recent years, the Neighborhood Corporation, a non-profit group has been active in revitalizing Weir Village and surround parts of Taunton. In 2005, it completed the restoration of the former Cohannet Mill No. 3 on Ingell Street into apartments and retail/office space. The agency is currently in the process of renovating the former F.B. Rogers Silver Company factory into loft residences.

The village contains a small, but active row of small shops, bars and restaurants, as well as the historic Weir Engine House, located at the intersection of Weir and Ingell Streets, which houses Taunton Fire Department's engine 3, ladder 3 and the Taunton Police weir precinct. A bridge over the Taunton River at Weir Village is a vital link for cross-town city traffic.

Weir Village is still home to several industrial and privately owned commercial businesses. Within a modern warehouse in between 4th Street and 5th Street are larger businesses dedicated to recreational sports and performing arts to benefit the youth of the community. The portion of the Taunton River that runs through the Weir Village is framed by two narrow public parks Weir Village Riverfront Park West and Weir Willage Riverfront Park East.

== See also ==
- List of mill towns in Massachusetts
