= Bristol-Plymouth Regional Technical School =

Location
- 207 Hart Street; Taunton, Massachusetts 02780; United States
- 41°52′41″N 71°03′44″W

Information
- Superintendent: Alexandre Magalhaes, Ed.D.
- Principal: Karen Guenette
- Faculty: 103.75 (FTE)
- Grades: 9-12
- Enrollment: 1,330 (2023-2024)
- Student to teacher ratio: 12.82
- Campus type: Suburban
- Colors: Navy, sky blue, and silver
- Athletics conference: Mayflower League
- Nickname: BP
- Budget: $24,026,297 total $18,872 per pupil (2016)
- Communities served: Bridgewater, Raynham, Berkley, Taunton, Rehoboth, Middleborough, Dighton, Freetown
- Affiliations: Skills USA, DECA, BPA, NHS, NTHS
- Website: www.bptech.org

Bristol-Plymouth Regional Technical School is a vocational high school located in Taunton, Massachusetts, United States, that has been in operation since September 1972. Bristol-Plymouth is one of the three high schools in the city of Taunton, and enrolls roughly 1,200 students in grades 9 through 12. The school draws students from the towns and cities of Bridgewater, Raynham, Berkley, Taunton, Rehoboth, Middleboro, Dighton and Freetown. Because it is considered to be its own school district, it has an on-site superintendent as well as a principal and vice principal.

The school colors are dark blue, light blue and silver. The athletic teams are known as the Craftsmen.

In 2017 the Bristol-Plymouth Football team came in first place in the Mayflower Athletic Conference.

== Academics ==
Bristol-Plymouth offers students courses in mathematics, English, physical and life sciences, social studies, Spanish, health, and physical education. The classes are for the most part divided into three learning tiers: Standard, Advanced, and Honors or AP (depending on the course and grade level). The school's Advanced Placement (AP) courses consists of Biology and U.S History for Sophomores, English Literature for Juniors, and Calculus AB and English Language for Seniors. The school also offers numerous trade-specific AP classes: the Biotechnology program offers AP Statistics, and the Computer Networking Technology program offers AP Computer Science Principles, both courses for Juniors.

== Technical programs ==
Bristol-Plymouth has nineteen technical programs:

- Automotive Technology
- Biotechnology
- Business and Applied Technology (formerly Computer Information Technology)
- CAD/CAM (formerly two separate technical programs)
- Carpentry
- Collision Technology
- Community Health
- Computer and Networking Technology (CNT)
- Cosmetology
- Culinary Arts (formerly Food Trades)
- Dental Assisting
- Design and Visual Communications (DVC)
- Early Childhood Education
- Electrical Technology
- Graphic Design
- Heating, Ventilation and Air Conditioning (HVAC)
- Metal Fabrication
- Plumbing
- Robotics & Engineering Technology

Students in the technical programs receive a hands-on learning experience. They receive practical training through outside jobs provided by the program. On-site Bristol-Plymouth has a hair salon, restaurant, daycare/preschool, computer service desk and car shop where students provide services to paying customers. In addition, many off-site shops operate within the community to provide additional services with "real-world" applications.

The school operates on an "A" and "B" week schedule; 9th and 11th graders are in the shop when the 10th and 12th graders are in academic classrooms, and vice versa.

In their junior and senior years, students have the opportunity to participate in a program known as CO-OP. Instead of attending traditional classes during the week of technical instruction, CO-OP students are allowed to work paid positions with local businesses related to their particular field of study.

== Demographics ==
According to the Massachusetts Department of Elementary and Secondary Education, there were 1,322 students enrolled for the 2014–2015 school year. 1,153 students (87.2%) were listed as White, 73 students (5.5%) as Hispanic, 44 students (3.3%) as African-American, 8 students (0.6%) as Asian, 7 students (0.5%) as Native American, and 37 students (2.8%) as multi-racial. 57.5% of the students were male, with 42.5% female.

In the 2013–2014 school year, there were 1281 students enrolled. Of these students, 1,131 students (88.3%) were listed as White, 64 students (5%) as Hispanic, 45 students (3.5%) as African-American, 5 students (0.4%) as Asian, and 31 students (2.4%) as multi-racial. 58.1% of students were male and 41.9% were female. Of all enrolled students, 6 were considered to be English Language Learners (ELL).

Based on data from the National Center for Education Statistics, in the 2012–2013 school year, there were 1,275 students enrolled. Of these students, 1,114 students (87.4%) were listed as White, 64 students (5%) as Hispanic, 53 students (4.2%) as Black, 5 students (0.4%) as Asian/Pacific Islander, 5 students (0.4%) as American Indian/Alaskan Native, and 34 students (2.7%) as multi-racial. 708 students (55.5%) were male and 567 students (44.5%) were female. In this school year, the student to teacher ratio was 13.44.
