= F. B. Rogers Silver Co. =

Silversmithing company in Massachusetts, US

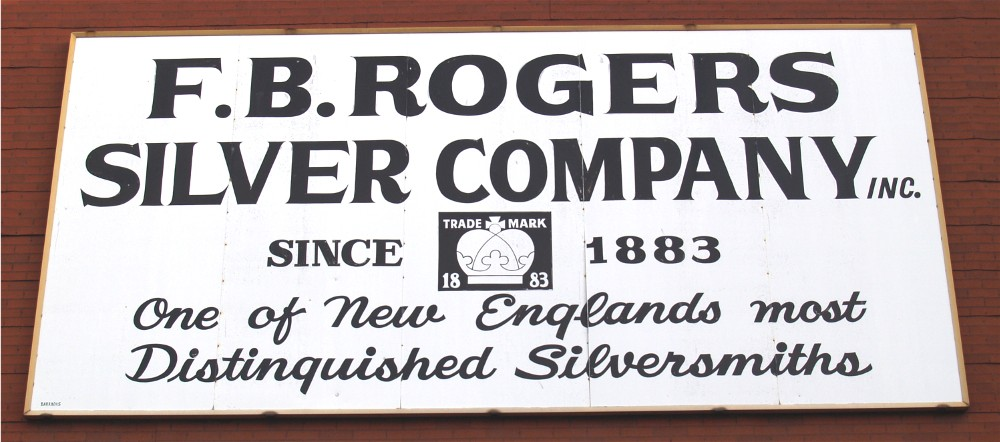
- Founded: Shelburne Falls, Massachusetts, 1883
- Defunct: 2000s
- Parent: National Silver Company

F. B. Rogers Silver Co. was a silversmithing company founded in Shelburne Falls, Massachusetts in 1883. It was acquired by Edmund W. Porter and L.B. West, who incorporated the company and moved manufacturing operations to Taunton, Massachusetts in 1886. For several years, the company operated under the name West Silver Company, and produced silver products for the William Rogers Manufacturing Company of Hartford, Connecticut.

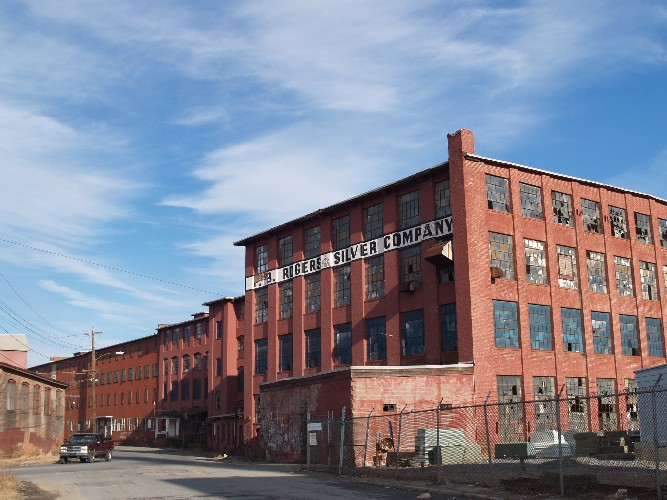
Former F.B. Rogers Silver Company, West Water Street, Taunton, Massachusetts

About 1904, West and Porter retired and sold the company to William Davison, Carleton A. Woodward and H.E. Nearing, who changed the company's name back to F.B. Rogers.

In 1925 the company moved from 31 Winthrop Street to 59 Wales Street. In 1943 it moved to West Water Street, to a site formerly occupied by the Weir Stove Company, who produced Glenwood Ranges.

In 1955, it became a division of the National Silver Company.

The company used many different marks over the years. One of them is a crown with the number 18 at the left and 83 at the right (for 1883).

In 2009 the 414 West Water Street property was demolished.

== See also ==
- Reed & Barton
- List of Registered Historic Places in Taunton, Massachusetts
- Weir Village, Massachusetts
