= Taunton, Massachusetts =

Taunton
- City
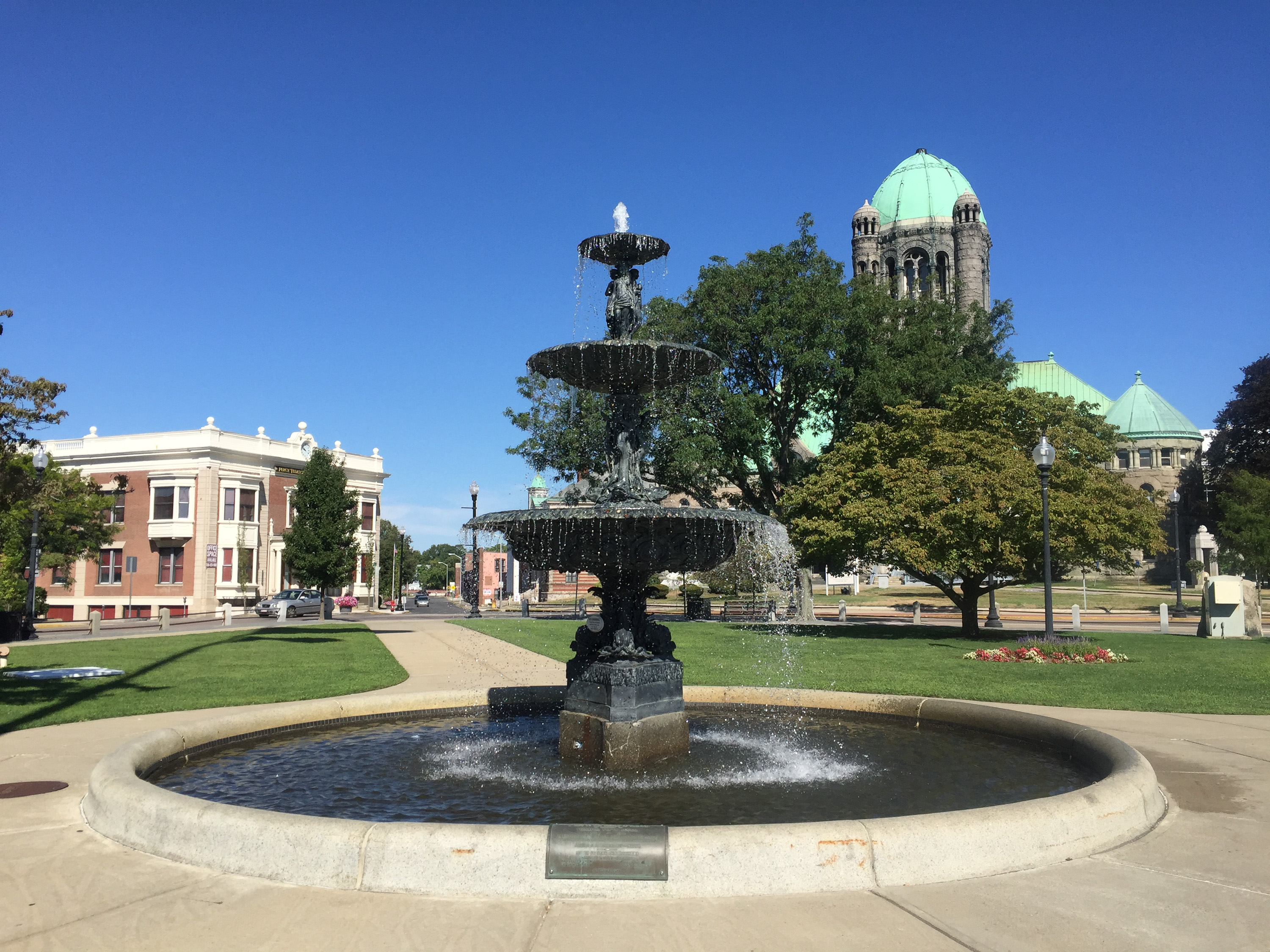
- Taunton Green

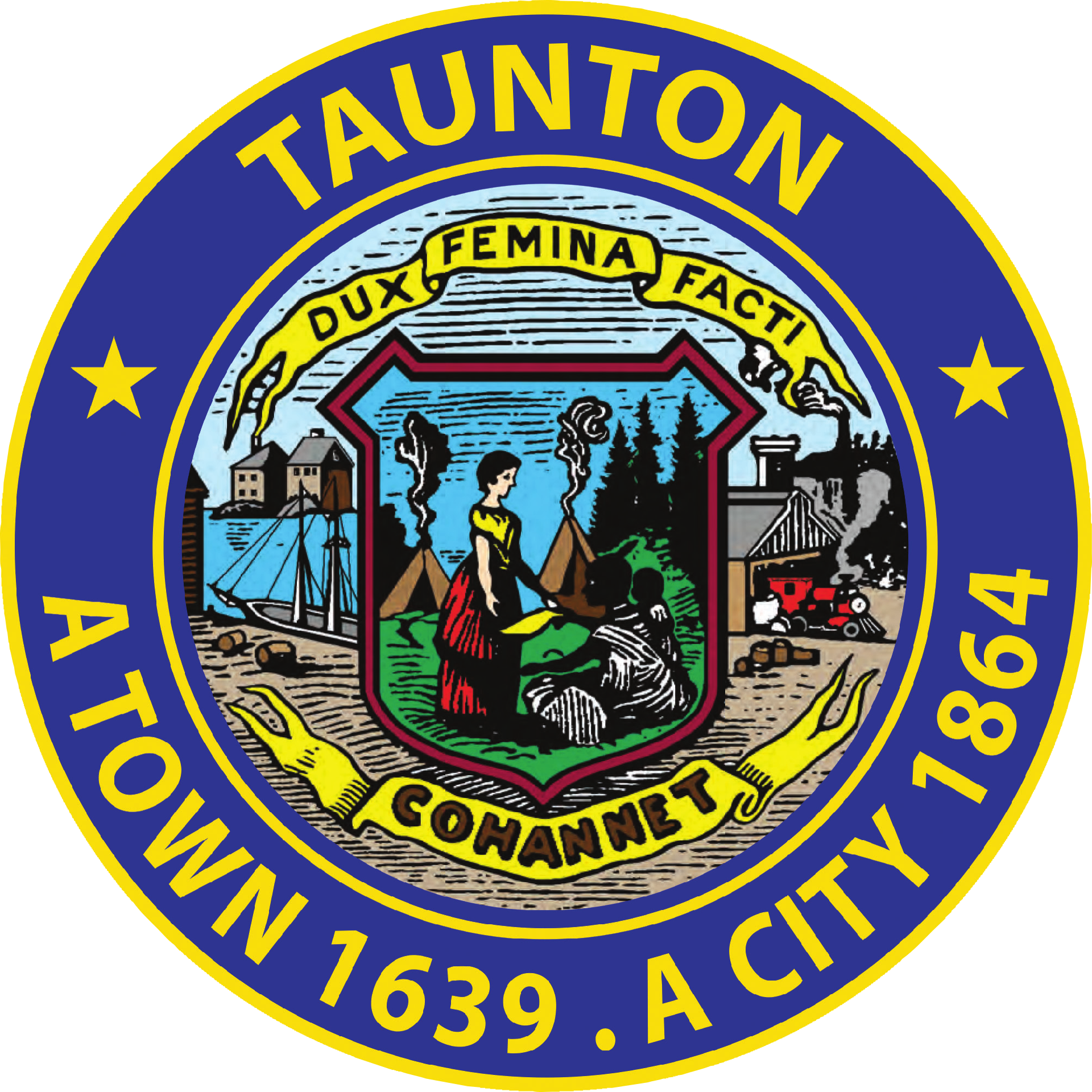
- Flag Seal
- Nicknames: The Silver City, The Christmas City
- Motto: Dux Femina Facti (Latin) "A woman led the deed."
- Location in Bristol County, Massachusetts

- Location in Massachusetts Taunton (the United States)
- Coordinates: 41°54′00″N 71°05′25″W
- Country: United States
- State: Massachusetts
- County: Bristol
- Settled: 1639
- Incorporated (Town): 1639
- Incorporated (City): 1864
- Named for: Taunton, England

Government
  - Type: Strong mayor / Council
  - Mayor: Shaunna O'Connell
  - Council: Taunton City Council
  - City Council President: Barry Sanders

Area
  - Total: 48.41 sq mi (125.39 km^{2})
  - Land: 46.71 sq mi (120.97 km^{2})
  - Water: 1.71 sq mi (4.42 km^{2})
- Elevation: 30 ft (9 m)

Population (2024)
  - Total: 59,408
  - Density: 1,271.9/sq mi (491.08/km^{2})
  - Demonym: Tauntonian
- Time zone: UTC−5 (Eastern)
  - Summer (DST): UTC−4 (Eastern)
- ZIP Codes: 02780 (Taunton); 02718 (East Taunton)
- Area code: 508 / 774
- FIPS code: 25-69170
- GNIS feature ID: 0613154
- Website: www.taunton-ma.gov

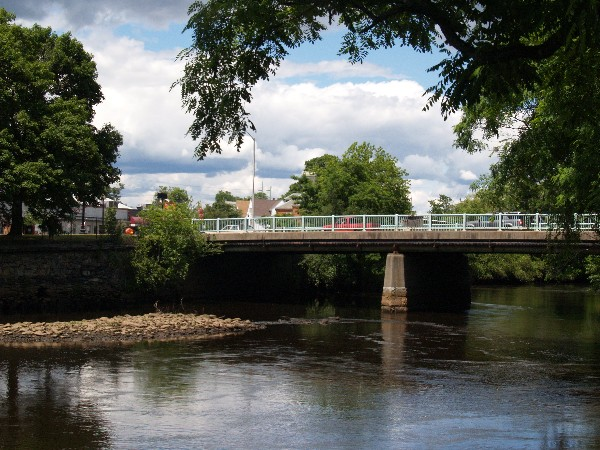
Weir Bridge, Taunton

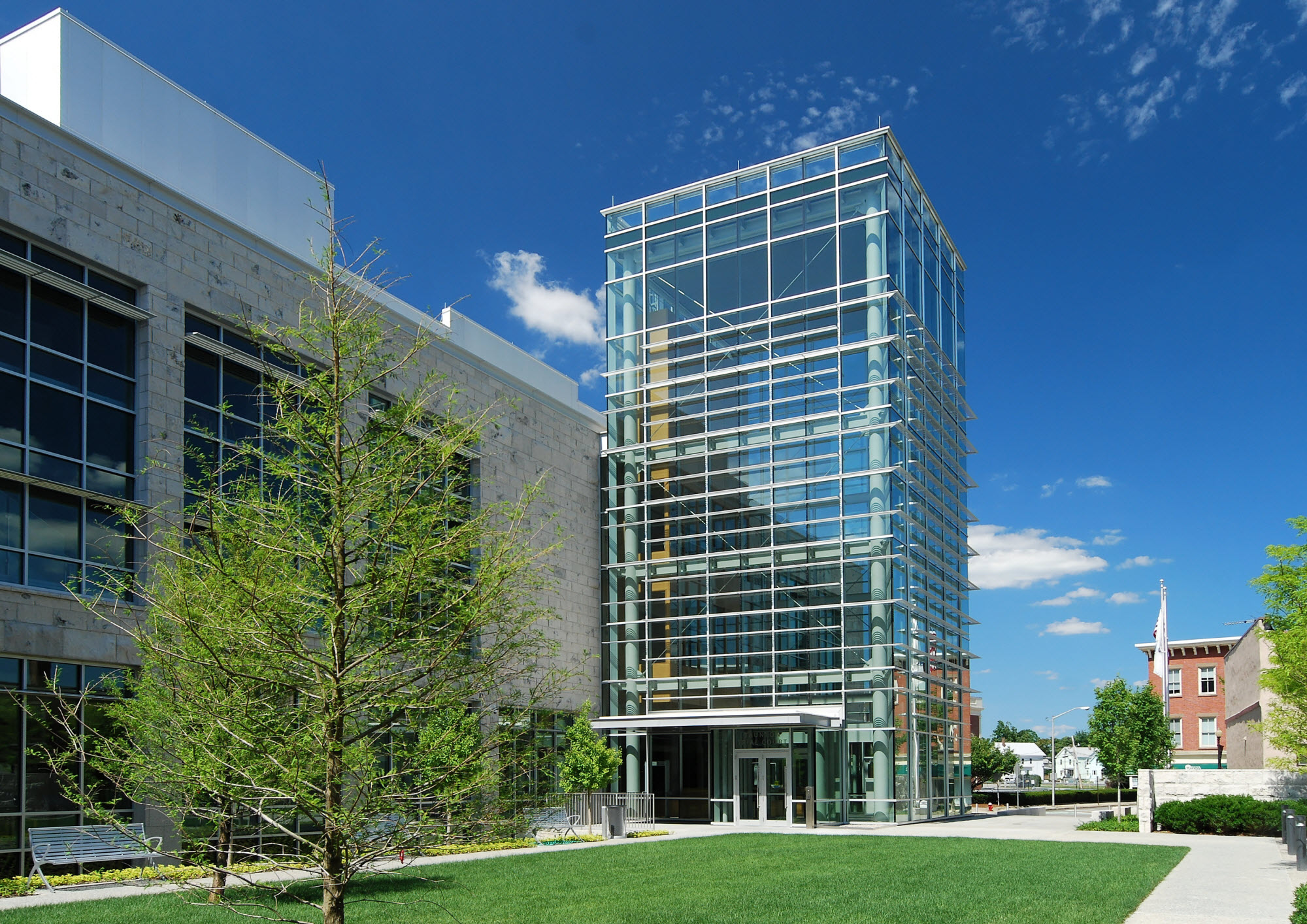
Taunton Trial Court, completed in 2011

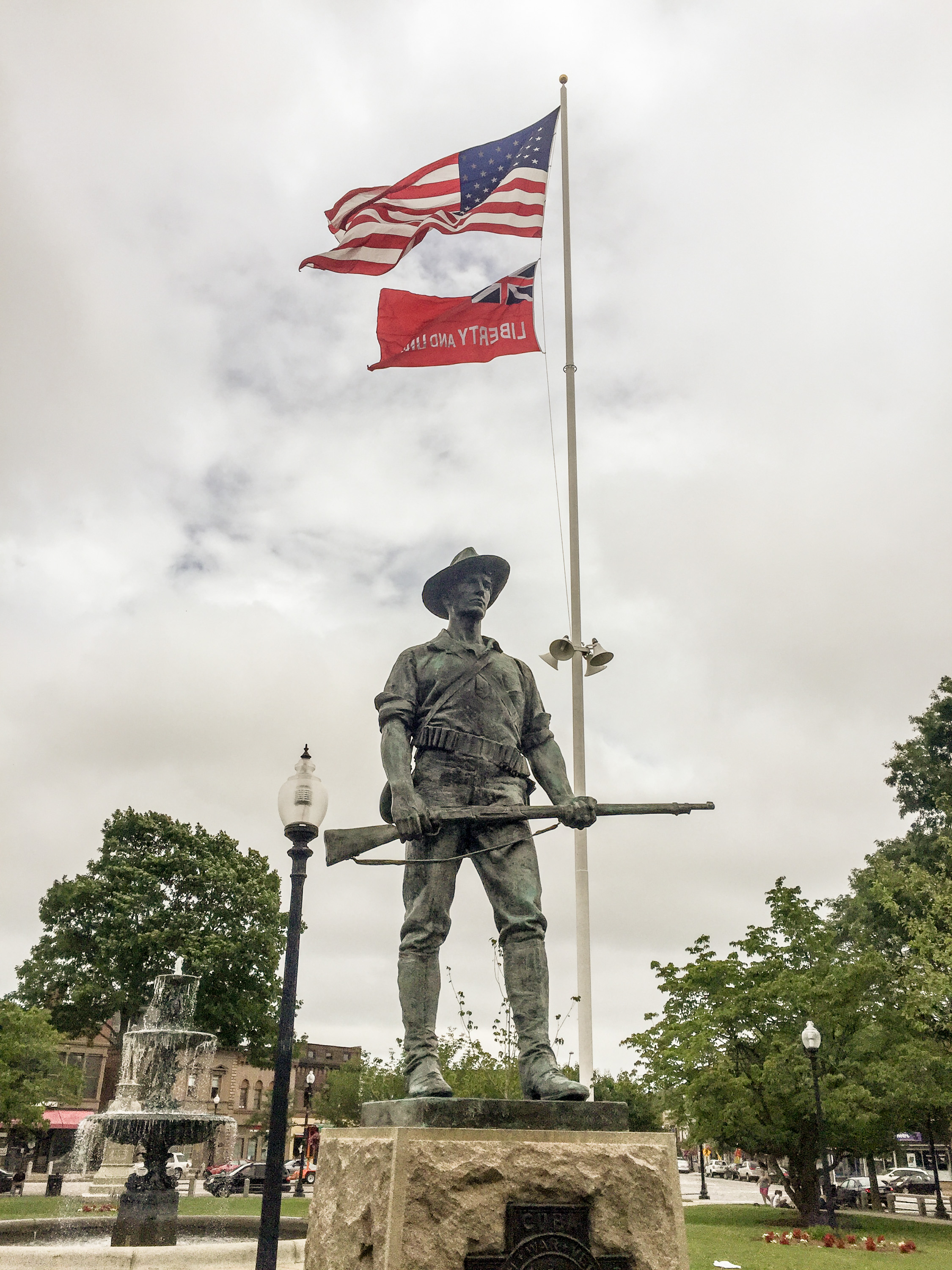
The "Hiker" Statue on Taunton Green

Taunton is a city in and the county seat of Bristol County, Massachusetts, United States. Taunton is situated on the Taunton River, which winds its way through the city on its way to Mount Hope Bay, 10 miles (16 km) to the south. As of the 2020 census, the city had a population of 59,408; this makes Taunton the third most populated municipality in Bristol County behind New Bedford and Fall River. Shaunna O'Connell is the mayor of Taunton.

Founded in 1637 by members of the Plymouth Colony, Taunton is one of the oldest towns in the United States. Taunton is also known as the "Silver City", as it was a historic center of the silver industry beginning in the 19th century when companies such as Reed & Barton, F. B. Rogers, Poole Silver, and others produced fine-quality silver goods in the city.

Since December 1914, the city of Taunton has provided a large annual light display each December on Taunton Green, giving it the additional nickname of the Christmas City.

The original boundaries of Taunton included the land now occupied by many surrounding towns, including Norton, Easton, Mansfield, Dighton, Raynham, Berkley, and Lakeville. Possession of the latter is still noted by the naming of Taunton Hill in Assonet.

== History ==
=== Beginnings ===
Taunton was founded by settlers from England and officially incorporated as a town on September 3, 1639. Most of the town's settlers were originally from Taunton in Somerset, England, which led early settlers to name the settlement after that town. At the time of Taunton's incorporation, they explained their choice of name as being "in honor and love to our dear native country." Prior to 1640, the Taunton area was called Cohannet, Tetiquet, or Titiquet.

The English founders of Taunton purchased the land from the Wampanoag Natives in 1637 as part of the Tetiquet Purchase and the remaining native families were relocated to the praying town of Ponkapoag in present-day Canton, Massachusetts. Elizabeth Poole, contrary to local folklore, (Note: "Her name does not appear as one of the original purchasers, although another lady 'Widdo Randall,' does. It is known that Ms. Poole became the owner of land in this vicinity, and an active promoter of its interests.") did not take part in the town purchase but was among its greatest benefactors and played a significant role in the founding of its church. Described as "the foundress of Taunton" and its matriarch, Poole "was accorded equality of rights, whether in the purchase of lands, [or] in the sharing of iron works holdings," having been a financier of the settlement's first dam and mill built for the manufacture of bar iron. (Note: "Several of the leading citizens of the place, including George Hall, Richard Williams, Walter Deane, James Walker, Oliver Purchis, Elizabeth Poole and others formed a joint stock company with a capital of £600, and built a dam accorss the Two Mile river, on the main road leading to Raynham, and made all the preparations for the manufacture of bar iron from bog ore.") Plymouth Colony was formally divided into counties on June 2, 1685, with Taunton becoming the shire town of Bristol County. The counties of Plymouth Colony were transferred to the Province of Massachusetts Bay on the arrival of its charter and governor on May 14, 1692. The Taunton area has been the site of skirmishes and battles during various conflicts, including King Philip's War and the American Revolution. Taunton was re-incorporated as a city on May 11, 1864.

=== Industrial legacy ===
In 1656, the first successful iron works in Plymouth Colony was established on the Two Mile River, in what is now part of Raynham. The Taunton Iron Works operated for over 200 years until 1876. It was the first of many iron industries in Taunton.

During the 19th century, Taunton became known as the "Silver City", as it was home to many silversmithing operations, including Reed & Barton, F.B. Rogers, the Poole Silver Company, and the Taunton Silverplate Company.

In the 19th century, Taunton was also the center of an important iron-making industry, utilizing much bog iron from the numerous swamps in the surrounding area. The iron industry in Taunton produced a variety of goods including stoves (Weir Stove Company/Glenwood), tacks (Field Tack Company) and machinery. One of the more successful companies during this period was the Mason Machine Works, founded by William Mason, which produced machinery for the textile industry, as well as steam locomotives. The Taunton Locomotive Works (begun in 1846) also operated in the city during this time.

Taunton was also home to several textile mills (Whittenton Mills) and other industries, such as felt (Bacon Felt) and brick making.

During the 19th century, Taunton was a major shipping point for grain from the inland, rural farm areas of Massachusetts to the rest of the nation via Weir Village and the Taunton River. With the advent of the railroad, Taunton would also become an important transportation hub due to its central location.

The city formed the Taunton Municipal Light Plant (TMLP) in 1897, when it decided to purchase the floundering Taunton Electric Lighting Company, making it a publicly owned electric utility. Today, TMLP provides electric service to 34,000 customers in Taunton, Berkley, Raynham; and sections of Dighton, Lakeville, and Bridgewater. TMLP is governed by a three-member Board of Commissioners, which is elected by the citizens of Taunton.

In the late 19th century, Taunton was a stop on the national bicycle racing circuit. In 1897, the one-mile (1.6 km) open event made news when third-place finisher W. E. Becker brutally attacked second-place winner Major Taylor, knocking him unconscious for fifteen minutes.

=== Twentieth century ===
Built in 1942, U.S. Army Camp Myles Standish was a departure point for over a million U.S. and allied military personnel bound for Europe during World War II. It also functioned as a prisoner of war camp housing German and Italian soldiers. While Camp Myles Standish was later closed in 1946, it was re-purposed as the Paul A. Dever School which was a facility that housed mentally disabled persons. The school site of 220 acres (89 ha) was shut down in 1982. This portion was turned into an expansion scheme for the existing the Myles Standish Industrial Park, Taunton's north end, which is currently one of the largest in New England, covering an area over 800 acres (320 ha). It services manufacturing, offices, high tech, and distribution centers.

=== Twenty-first century ===
In October 2005, the Whittenton Pond Dam north of the downtown area threatened to fail following a week that brought 9 inches (230 mm) of rain to the city. Over 2,000 city residents were evacuated, all downtown businesses were ordered closed, and Mayor Robert Nunes issued a state of emergency. It is estimated that if the dam had failed, the Mill River would have inundated the downtown area with up to 6 feet (1.8 m) of water. In response, Massachusetts Governor Mitt Romney ordered an immediate inspection of high-risk dams throughout the Commonwealth.

In 2010, the historic Taunton City Hall was severely damaged in an arson fire. City government operated out of the former Lowell M. Maxham School on Oak Street for ten years, until the building was renovated and re-opened in September 2020.

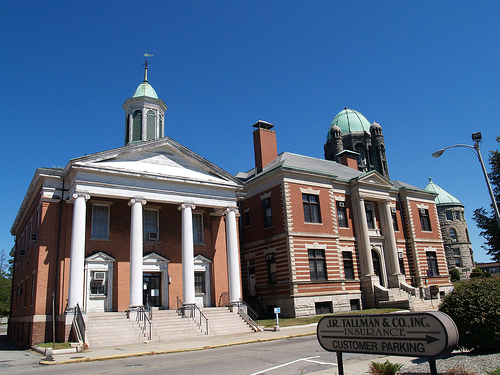
Taunton Courthouse Complex

In 2012 Taunton became the target location for a Wampanoag casino complex which was embroiled in conflict by competing regional bands of the Wampanoag over territory claims. The proposed location for the casino-resort complex is adjacent to a local elementary school and the regional technical high school, generating protests by parent and teacher groups.

Several major companies operate within the industrial park and in other parts of the city.

On June 10, 2012, the City of Taunton dedicated the Taunton Global War on Terrorism War Memorial on Church Green.

Taunton is home to a General Dynamics Mission Systems factory, which develops military communications equipment.

== Geography ==
Municipalities (in grey) that were once part of Taunton

According to the United States Census Bureau, the city has a total area of 48.4 square miles (125.4 km^{2}), of which 46.4 square miles (120.1 km^{2}) is land and 1.7 square miles (4.4 km^{2}), or 3.53%, is water. It is the third-largest city by area in Massachusetts, after Boston and Barnstable.

Taunton has one major river, the Taunton River, along with its tributaries, including the Mill River and the Three Mile River. The highest point in the city is near its southwest corner, with an elevation of 207 feet (63 m) above sea level. Prospect Hill, rising over Lake Sabbatia north of the downtown, has an elevation of 197 feet (60 m).

=== Climate ===
According to the Köppen climate classification, Taunton has either a hot-summer humid continental climate (abbreviated Dfa), or a hot-summer humid sub-tropical climate (abbreviated Cfa), depending on the isotherm used.

Climate data for Taunton, Massachusetts, 1991–2020 normals, extremes 1997–present
Month	Jan	Feb	Mar	Apr	May	Jun	Jul	Aug	Sep	Oct	Nov	Dec	Year
Record high °F (°C)	71 (22)	70 (21)	84 (29)	94 (34)	96 (36)	99 (37)	100 (38)	103 (39)	95 (35)	87 (31)	80 (27)	76 (24)	103 (39)
Mean maximum °F (°C)	59.9 (15.5)	58.1 (14.5)	66.9 (19.4)	78.9 (26.1)	88.5 (31.4)	91.6 (33.1)	95.5 (35.3)	93.0 (33.9)	89.1 (31.7)	80.2 (26.8)	70.7 (21.5)	63.1 (17.3)	97.2 (36.2)
Mean daily maximum °F (°C)	38.0 (3.3)	40.0 (4.4)	47.5 (8.6)	58.7 (14.8)	69.5 (20.8)	77.8 (25.4)	83.6 (28.7)	82.4 (28.0)	75.0 (23.9)	63.1 (17.3)	52.6 (11.4)	43.3 (6.3)	61.0 (16.1)
Daily mean °F (°C)	28.8 (−1.8)	30.7 (−0.7)	38.0 (3.3)	48.1 (8.9)	58.7 (14.8)	67.3 (19.6)	73.2 (22.9)	72.2 (22.3)	64.7 (18.2)	53.0 (11.7)	43.4 (6.3)	34.5 (1.4)	51.1 (10.6)
Mean daily minimum °F (°C)	19.7 (−6.8)	21.4 (−5.9)	28.5 (−1.9)	37.5 (3.1)	47.8 (8.8)	56.8 (13.8)	62.8 (17.1)	62.0 (16.7)	54.3 (12.4)	43.0 (6.1)	34.1 (1.2)	25.7 (−3.5)	41.1 (5.1)
Mean minimum °F (°C)	−0.8 (−18.2)	1.7 (−16.8)	10.7 (−11.8)	23.2 (−4.9)	32.1 (0.1)	40.9 (4.9)	49.5 (9.7)	45.9 (7.7)	34.7 (1.5)	25.3 (−3.7)	17.3 (−8.2)	8.1 (−13.3)	−3.1 (−19.5)
Record low °F (°C)	−12 (−24)	−16 (−27)	−6 (−21)	14 (−10)	27 (−3)	36 (2)	43 (6)	42 (6)	31 (−1)	19 (−7)	10 (−12)	−3 (−19)	−16 (−27)
Average precipitation inches (mm)	3.72 (94)	3.43 (87)	5.05 (128)	4.75 (121)	3.38 (86)	4.08 (104)	3.50 (89)	3.61 (92)	3.88 (99)	4.28 (109)	4.15 (105)	4.94 (125)	48.77 (1,239)
Average snowfall inches (cm)	8.3 (21)	7.0 (18)	4.9 (12)	1.6 (4.1)	0.0 (0.0)	0.0 (0.0)	0.0 (0.0)	0.0 (0.0)	0.0 (0.0)	0.0 (0.0)	0.2 (0.51)	3.7 (9.4)	25.7 (65.01)
Average precipitation days (≥ 0.01 in)	10.6	7.5	8.6	10.2	11.1	9.5	8.8	9.4	9.5	9.0	10.1	10.3	114.6
Average snowy days (≥ 0.1 in)	3.6	2.5	2.0	0.2	0.0	0.0	0.0	0.0	0.0	0.0	0.1	1.3	9.7
Source 1: NOAA
Source 2: National Weather Service (mean maxima/minima 2006–2020)

=== Historic districts ===
There are nine designated historic districts within the city:

- Bay Road Historic District, also known as Post Road. The road runs from Taunton to Boston. (1,300 acres or 530 ha), 1 structure, 2 objects)
- Bristol County Courthouse Complex (13 acres, three buildings)
- Church Green Historic District, also known as Meetinghouse Common (160 acres, 18 buildings, one object)
- Hopewell Mills District (120 acres, 13 buildings)
- Old Bay Road Historic District, also known as The Post Road; The King's Highway (150 acres, 1 structure, three objects)
- Reed and Barton Complex
- Taunton Green Historic District (50 acres, 22 buildings, three objects)
- Taunton State Hospital Historic District, also known as the Taunton Lunatic Asylum (1,250 acres or 510 ha), 38 buildings, eight structures)

Due to the annexation of towns from the original town of Taunton, the city now is irregularly shaped; with it (along with neighboring Raynham) roughly making a triangle. The city is bordered by Norton to the northwest, Easton to the north, Raynham to the northeast, Middleborough to the east, Lakeville to the southeast, Berkley and Dighton to the south, and Rehoboth to the west.

City neighborhoods include the Bird Lanes, Clearview Estates, East Taunton, Elliot's Corner, Herring Run Estates, Linden Estates, Matthews Landing, North Taunton, Oakland, Pine Crest Estates, Pine Hill Estates, Wades Corner, Weir Village, Westville, Whittenton, Whittenton Junction, Britannia Village or Britanniaville, Willis Lake Village, and Woodward Estates. Taunton is also home to almost the entirety of Massasoit State Park in East Taunton, and a large portion of the Hockomock Swamp Wildlife Management Area in North Taunton.

== Demographics ==
Historical population
Year	Pop.	±%
1790	3,804	—
1800	3,860	+1.5%
1810	3,907	+1.2%
1820	4,520	+15.7%
1830	6,042	+33.7%
1840	7,645	+26.5%
1850	10,441	+36.6%
1860	15,376	+47.3%
1870	18,629	+21.2%
1880	21,213	+13.9%
1890	25,448	+20.0%
1900	31,036	+22.0%
1910	34,259	+10.4%
1920	37,137	+8.4%
1930	37,355	+0.6%
1940	37,395	+0.1%
1950	40,109	+7.3%
1960	41,132	+2.6%
1970	43,756	+6.4%
1980	45,001	+2.8%
1990	49,832	+10.7%
2000	55,976	+12.3%
2010	55,874	−0.2%
2020	59,408	+6.3%
2024*	61,936	+4.3%
* = population estimate. Source: United States census records and Population Estimates Program data. Source: U.S. Decennial Census

=== 2020 census ===
As of the 2020 census, Taunton had a population of 59,408. The median age was 41.2 years. 20.5% of residents were under the age of 18 and 16.5% of residents were 65 years of age or older. For every 100 females there were 92.5 males, and for every 100 females age 18 and over there were 90.4 males age 18 and over.

95.7% of residents lived in urban areas, while 4.3% lived in rural areas.

There were 23,720 households in Taunton, of which 28.8% had children under the age of 18 living in them. Of all households, 40.2% were married-couple households, 20.2% were households with a male householder and no spouse or partner present, and 30.9% were households with a female householder and no spouse or partner present. About 29.9% of all households were made up of individuals and 11.7% had someone living alone who was 65 years of age or older.

There were 24,965 housing units, of which 5.0% were vacant. The homeowner vacancy rate was 1.2% and the rental vacancy rate was 4.4%.

Racial composition as of the 2020 census
Race	Number	Percentage
White	44,376	74.7%
Black or African American	5,179	8.7%
American Indian and Alaska Native	160	0.3%
Asian	739	1.2%
Native Hawaiian and Other Pacific Islander	30	0.1%
Some other race	2,944	5.0%
Two or more races	5,980	10.1%
Hispanic or Latino (of any race)	4,717	7.9%

=== 2000 census ===
As of the census of 2000, there were 55,874 people, 22,045 households, and 14,473 families residing in the city. The population density was 1,200.1 inhabitants per square mile (463.4/km^{2}). There were 22,908 housing units at an average density of 491.5 per square mile (189.8/km^{2}). The racial makeup of the city was 83.67% (79.7% Non-Hispanic) White, 4.84% African American, 0.26% Native American, 1.0% Asian, 0.03% Pacific Islander, 5.59% from other races, and 2.21% from two or more races. Persons of Hispanic or Latino ethnicity constituted 6.73% of the population.

The city of Taunton was very multi-cultural with peoples of different origins living within the city. 34% of the city was Luso-American. The biggest ethnic backgrounds people claimed were 23% Portuguese, 17% Irish, 9% English, 9% French, 8% Cape Verdean, and 4% Puerto Rican. Most of Taunton's immigration occurred near the turn of the 1900s when immigrants came to work in the city's mills.

Of these households, 32.3% had children under the age of 18 living with them, 45.0% were married couples living together, 15.4% had a female householder with no husband present, and 35.3% were non-families. Of all households 28.2% were made up of individuals, and 9.9% had someone living alone who was 65 years of age or older. The average household size was 2.60 and the average family size was 3.09.

In the city, the population was spread out, with 24.9% under the age of 18, 8.0% from 18 to 24, 33.2% from 25 to 44, 21.0% from 45 to 64, and 12.9% who were 65 years of age or older. The median age was 36 years. For every 100 females, there were 92.5 males. For every 100 females age 18 and over, there were 89.2 males.

Males had a median income of $36,895 versus $27,686 for females. The per capita income for the city was $19,899. About 10.0% of families and 12.0% of the population were below the poverty line, including 13.9% of those under age 18 and 11.3% of those age 65 or over.

=== Religion ===
Numerous religious groups exist within the city, including Roman Catholic, Protestant, Muslim and Jewish congregations. The First Parish Church - now a Unitarian Universalist church, located at Church Green at the east end of downtown - was founded in 1637, before the Town of Taunton was even established. The current church dates from 1830. The Pilgrim Congregational Church on Broadway was formed in 1821, its current church built in 1851. The city's oldest Roman Catholic parish - St. Mary's Church - is located further north at the intersection of Broadway and Washington Street, and is known as Saint Mary's Square. The town is home to the IQRA Islamic Center on Whittenton Street, and the local Muslim congregation is currently raising funds to build a new mosque. In the 1880s, Jewish immigrants from Russia began to move to the town; Congregation Agudath Achim was founded in 1911. The congregation is now an independent, progressive synagogue.

== Economy ==
Taunton's economy has historically been based on silversmithing and shipbuilding. Reed & Barton produced the 1996 Summer Olympics medals and silverware used exclusively for the White House. Also, the city produced the anchor for the USS Constitution. The nearby town of Raynham produced the anchor for the Civil War-era ironclad USS Monitor.

Today, the city's economy has emphases on semiconductor, silicon, and electronics manufacturing. It is home to the corporate headquarters of many leading corporations in various industries. Currently, the city is trying to attract biotechnology research companies to its industrial parks.

Silver City Galleria was a large shopping mall in Taunton catering to the local city and to the neighboring towns and cities of Raynham, Berkley, Rehoboth, Dighton, New Bedford, Fall River, Norton, Easton, Assonet, Acushnet, Bridgewater, Lakeville, Middleboro, and Freetown. It was open for 28 years, closing on February 29, 2020 and was demolished on May 9, 2021.

== Arts and culture ==
=== Public spaces ===
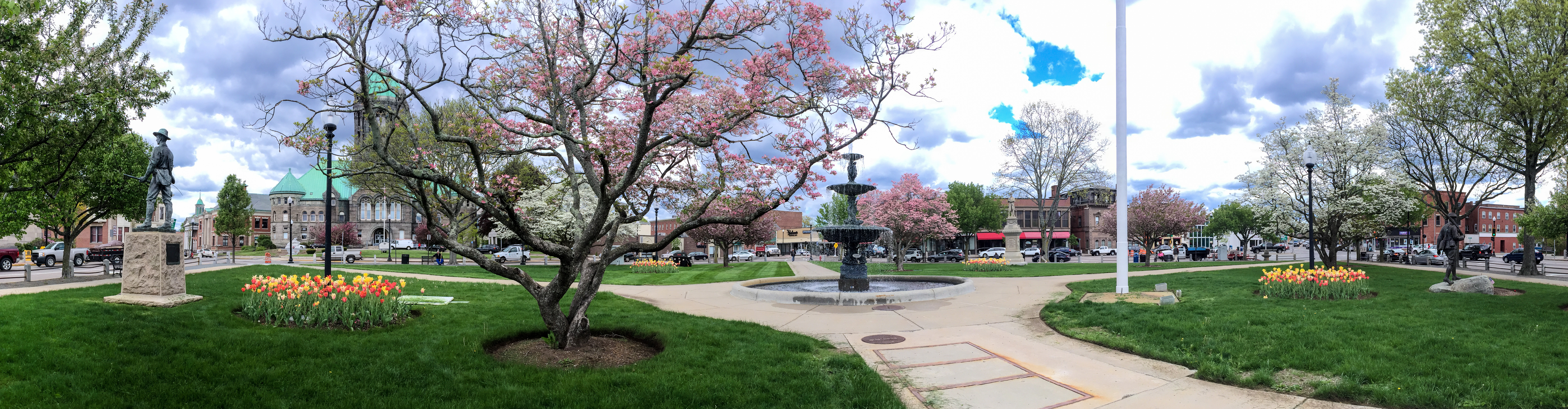
Daffodils and flowering trees brighten Taunton Green on a spring day.

The Taunton Green is the city's central square. Early in its history, "The Green" was used as a training ground for militias in the American Revolution. Some say it was also the site of the historic "Liberty & Union"/"Taunton" flag raising in 1774 by the Sons of Liberty, prior to the American Revolution. Since the early 20th century, Taunton Green has temporarily been transformed during the winter holiday season into a grand display of holiday lights, scenes, and extravagant events. This is where and how the city earned its unofficial nickname in the surrounding areas as the "Christmas City."

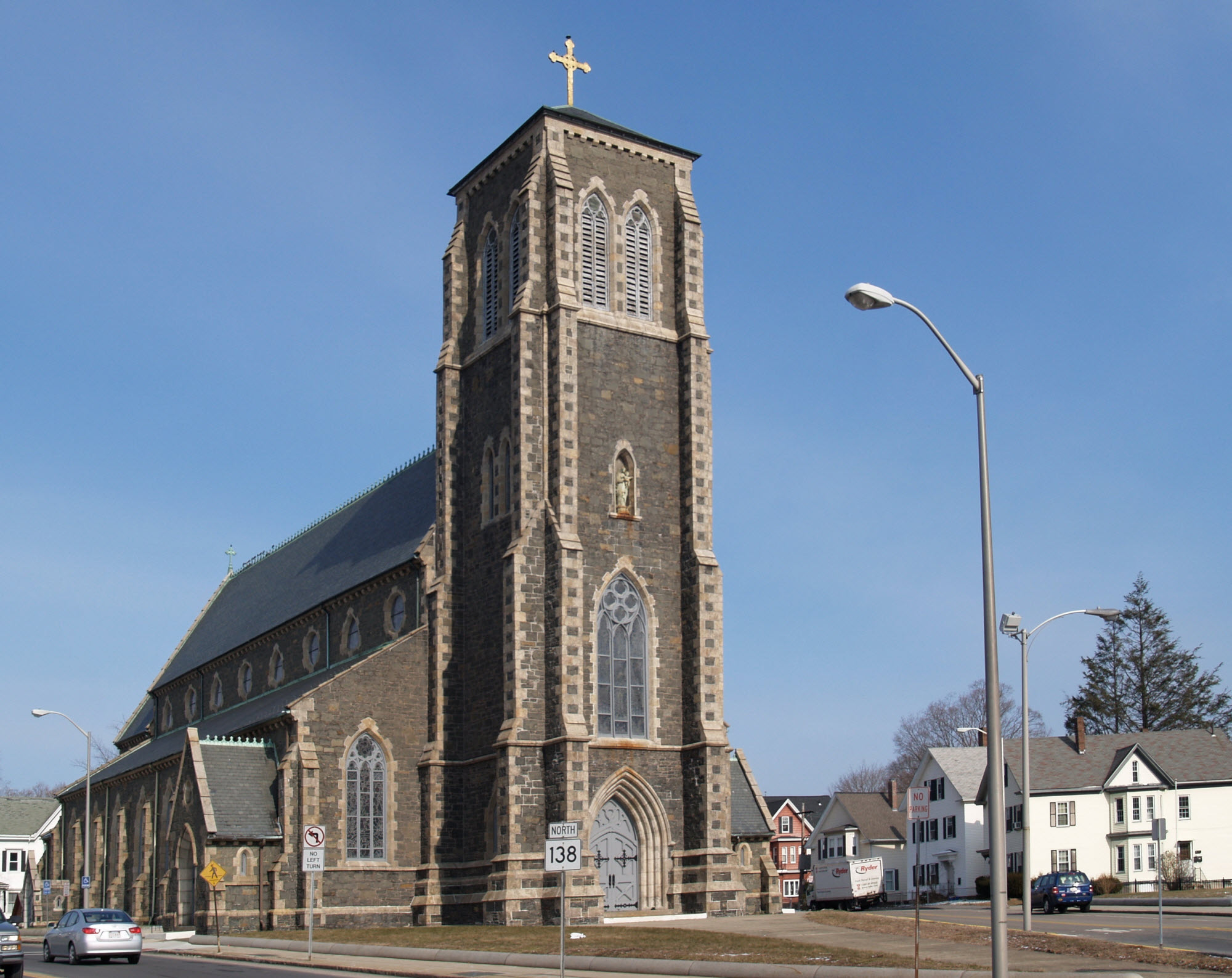
St. Mary's Church

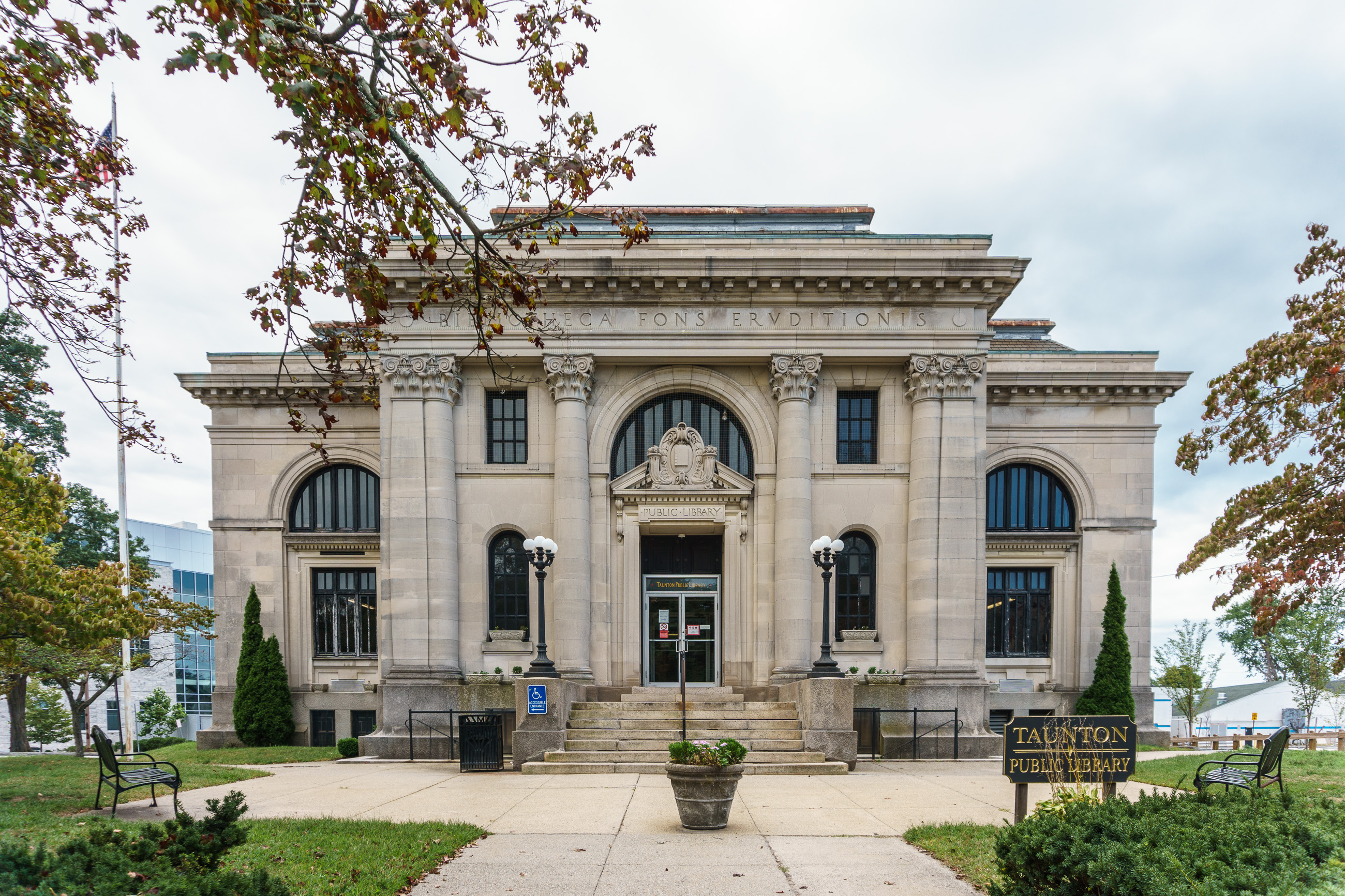
Taunton Public Library

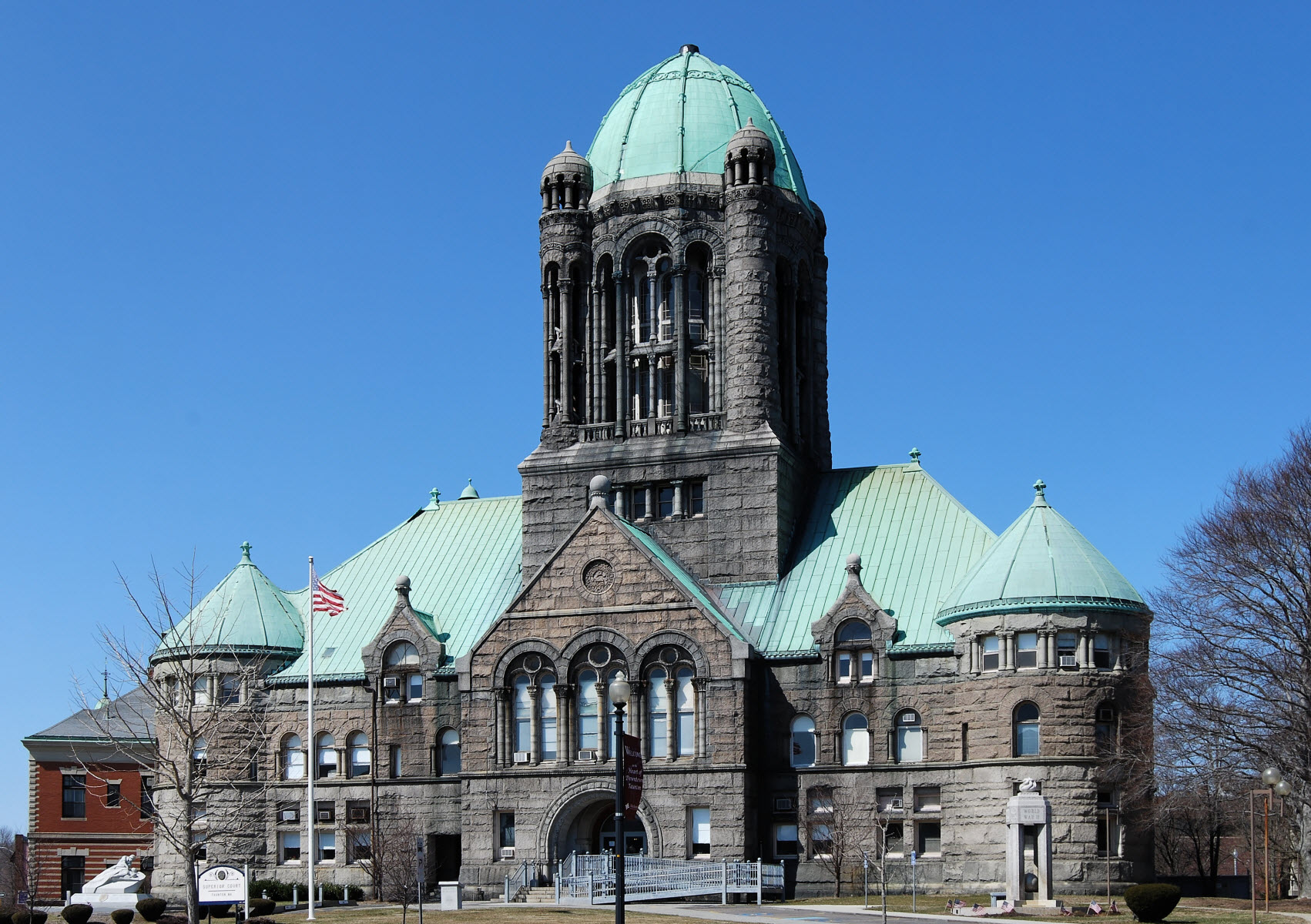
Bristol County Superior Courthouse, Taunton

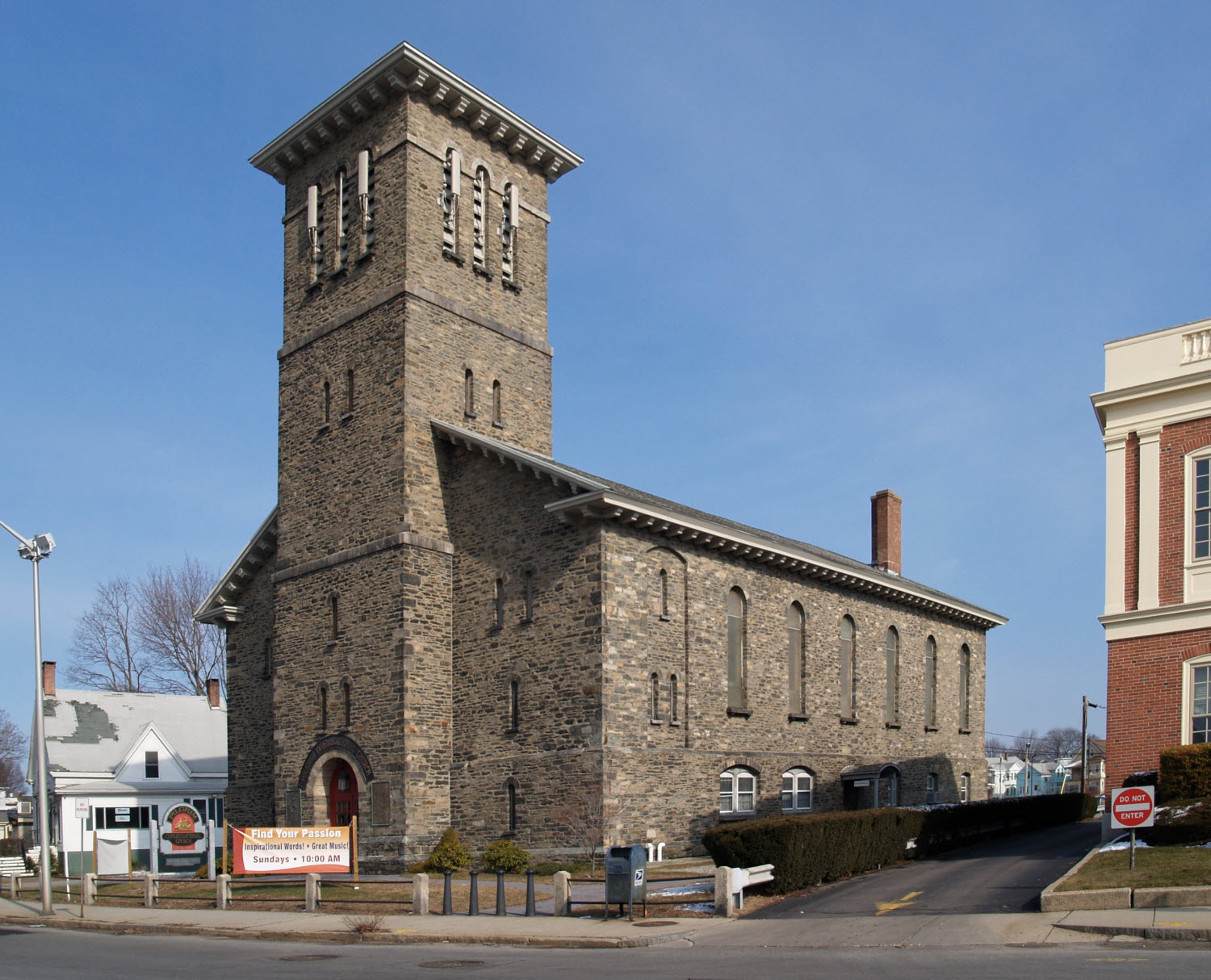
Pilgrim Congregational Church

"The Green" continues to provide a centralized location for citywide Christmas activities, other holidays, events, and parades for the citizens of Taunton. A fountain is located at the center of the Taunton Green. The "Liberty & Union" flag and the U.S. flag fly side-by-side on the flagpole at the city's center.

The city is served by a central public library, the Taunton Public Library, which opened in 1903 and has undergone several expansions and renovations since that time. Also of note is the Old Colony Historical Society, which archives the city and region's past.

The city is home to two state parks operated by the Massachusetts Department of Conservation and Recreation: Massasoit State Park in East Taunton and Watson Pond State Park in the north part of the city.

=== Architecture ===
The city of Taunton has a wide array of architecture ranging from the colonial period to modern times. There are numerous pre-Revolutionary War private homes within the city. The oldest of these is the Joseph Willis House on Worcester Street, which to about 1688. The city has over one hundred buildings listed on the National Register of Historic Places.

Perhaps the most impressive structure in the city is the towering Bristol County Superior Courthouse, which built in 1894 and designed by Frank Irving Cooper. With its tall, copper dome the Superior Courthouse is visible from many surrounding areas. It was added to the National Register of Historic Places in 1978. Currently, the Courthouse Complex is undergoing a major expansion and renovation program.

Other significant buildings in the city include some fine, stone churches; including the First Parish Church (1830); the Pilgrim Congregational Church (1851); and St. Mary's Church (1868) on Broadway.

Downtown Taunton has a number of historic, commercial blocks along Main Street, Taunton Green, and Broadway. These were built during the period between around 1840 to 1920.

Many large homes built by the wealthy industrialists and merchants of the late 19th and early 20th century line Route 44 both east (Dean Street) and west (Winthrop Street) of the city center; however, a majority of the city is occupied by more modest, wood-framed single and multi-family homes, many over 100 years old. Modern, single-family subdivisions - built mostly since the 1950s - exist on the outskirts of the sprawling city.

The Central Fire Station at 50 School Street is recognized as the oldest functioning station house in the United States. The historic Taunton City Hall is located adjacent to Church Green.

=== Museums and galleries ===
One of New England's oldest historical societies, the Old Colony Historical Society is located on the picturesque Church Green. Founded in 1853, the Society maintains a museum of regional objects, houses a research library specializing in local history and genealogy, and hosts arts and cultural events throughout the year.

Taunton has four art galleries: Taunton Art Association (John Baradas Gallery), Hughes/Donahue Gallery, Art Euphoric, and the Trescott Street Gallery. The Taunton Art Association was founded in 1973 but had it roots in the Girl's Club in the early 1960s. Hughes/Donahue Gallery, founded in 2007, is a local community gallery serving local Taunton artists, as well as the surrounding areas of Southeastern Massachusetts and the cities of Providence, Rhode Island, and Washington, DC. Art Euphoric, founded in 2008, has both visual and craft exhibits and sales. The Trescott Street Gallery, founded in 2012, is primarily a visual-arts gallery but also exhibits crafts.

=== Film ===
In March 2008, Hollywood director Martin Scorsese filmed a portion of the film Shutter Island starring Leonardo DiCaprio in Taunton on-location at the Whittenton Mills Complex. Surrogates (2009) – starring Bruce Willis – was partly filmed in the city, at the old Paul Dever school.

== Government ==
As the seat of Bristol County, Taunton hosts several important county institutions, including the Taunton District Court, Bristol County Register of Deeds, and the historic Bristol County Superior Courthouse.

Taunton operates under a mayor–council government. The mayor is elected to a two-year term and serves as the city's chief executive. Shaunna O'Connell has served as mayor since January 2020, becoming the first woman elected to the office in Taunton's history. She succeeded Thomas Hoye Jr., who resigned after being appointed Register of Probate for Bristol County by Governor Charlie Baker.

The Taunton City Council functions as the legislative branch and consists of nine at-large members elected to two-year terms. Voters may select up to nine candidates in municipal elections, with the top vote-getters elected to the council. The council presidency rotates annually, traditionally going to the most senior member who has not yet held the position.

In addition to the City Council, Taunton voters elect members to several other local bodies, including the School Committee, Zoning Board of Appeals, Planning Board, and Taunton Municipal Lighting Plant (TMLP) Commission. Other commissions and boards are filled through mayoral appointments and City Council confirmations.

Taunton is represented in the Massachusetts House of Representatives by:

- Rep. Lisa Field (D–3rd Bristol District),
- Rep. Justin Thurber (R–5th Bristol District),
- Rep. Norm Orrall (R–12th Bristol District).

In the Massachusetts Senate, Taunton is represented by Sen. Kelly Dooner (R–1st Plymouth and Bristol District). Federally, the city is part of Massachusetts' 4th congressional district, which is represented by Rep. Jake Auchincloss. Taunton is also represented in the U.S. Senate by Senators Elizabeth Warren and Ed Markey.

Taunton has been home to several notable political figures. Among them is Robert Treat Paine, a signer of the Declaration of Independence and the first Massachusetts Attorney General following American independence. Marcus Morton, a former governor, and Stephanie Cutter, a prominent Democratic political consultant, also hail from Taunton.

Twelve U.S. presidents have visited Taunton. Notably, Abraham Lincoln campaigned in the city on behalf of Zachary Taylor before the 1848 presidential election, twelve years before Lincoln was elected president himself. Most recently, Bill Clinton visited Friedman Middle School ahead of Super Tuesday for Hillary Clinton's 2016 presidential campaign.

During World War II, Camp Myles Standish served as a major prisoner-of-war camp and staging area for over one million Allied soldiers. The site was briefly considered as a potential location for the United Nations headquarters.

Taunton presidential election results
Year	Democratic	Republican	Third parties	Total Votes	Margin
2020	56.01% 14,996	41.64% 11,148	2.35% 629	26,773	14.37%
2016	52.08% 12,365	42.01% 9,973	5.91% 1,404	23,742	10.07%
2012	59.58% 13,769	38.62% 8,925	1.81% 418	23,112	20.96%
2008	58.77% 13,243	38.50% 8,677	2.73% 615	22,535	20.26%
2004	62.22% 13,206	36.77% 7,804	1.00% 213	21,223	25.45%
2000	65.10% 12,886	29.38% 5,816	5.51% 1,091	19,793	35.72%
1996	63.27% 10,635	23.76% 3,994	12.97% 2,181	16,810	39.51%
1992	44.75% 8,683	26.02% 5,049	29.23% 5,673	19,405	15.51%
1988	52.82% 8,953	46.05% 7,805	1.13% 191	16,949	6.77%
1984	47.12% 7,516	52.27% 8,337	0.61% 97	15,950	5.15%
1980	45.73% 7,591	39.82% 6,610	14.45% 2,398	16,599	5.91%
1976	63.06% 11,329	33.67% 6,049	3.27% 588	17,966	29.39%
1972	58.91% 10,009	40.47% 6,876	0.62% 105	16,990	18.44%
1968	68.45% 11,735	27.20% 4,663	4.35% 745	17,143	41.25%
1964	79.83% 13,786	19.99% 3,452	0.18% 31	17,269	59.84%
1960	67.56% 12,652	32.32% 6,053	0.12% 22	18,727	35.24%
1956	43.48% 8,001	56.30% 10,360	0.22% 41	18,402	12.82%
1952	50.63% 9,748	49.19% 9,471	0.18% 35	19,254	1.44%
1948	64.84% 11,592	34.52% 6,172	0.64% 115	17,879	30.31%
1944	56.51% 8,645	43.36% 6,633	0.13% 20	15,298	13.15%
1940	57.54% 9,687	42.21% 7,106	0.25% 42	16,835	15.33%

Voter Registration and Party Enrollment as of August 24, 2024
Party	Number of Voters	Percentage
Democratic	9,397	27.9%
Republican	3,366	9.5%
Unaffiliated	30,306	60.9%
Libertarian	210	0.7%
Total	43,640	100%

== Education ==
Education in Taunton ranges from preschool through post-secondary education.

=== Public primary and secondary ===
Taunton has nine public elementary schools and three public middle schools.

==== Elementary schools ====
- Edmund Hatch Bennett Elementary School
- East Taunton Elementary School
- Harold H. Galligan Elementary School
- Hopewell Elementary School
- Edward F. Leddy PreSchool
- Joseph C. Chamberlain Elementary School
- Elizabeth Pole Elementary School
- Mulcahey Elementary School (formerly Mulcahey Middle School)

==== Middle schools ====
- Benjamin A. Friedman Middle School
- Joseph H. Martin Middle School
- John F. Parker Middle School

==== High schools ====
Taunton has three public high schools: Taunton High School, Taunton Alternative High School, and Bristol-Plymouth Regional Technical School.

Closed former schools in Taunton include:

- Lowell M. Maxham Elementary School (closed in June 2010)
- Walker Elementary School (closed in June 2010)
- Pole Elementary School (closed 2007)
- Leonard Elementary School (closed 2009)
- Barnum School (closed 2013)
- Cohannet Middle School (closed in June 2000)
- Summer Street School
- Coyle and Cassidy High School (Closed 2020)

=== Private schools ===
The city has one Catholic school of the Roman Catholic Diocese of Fall River - Our Lady of Lourdes School - in Weir Village, serving grades Pre-K–8.

Taunton formerly had one Catholic middle-high school, Coyle and Cassidy School. Prior to 2014 it had only high school and a separate Taunton Catholic Middle School provided middle school, but that year the two merged into the Coyle and Cassidy building. Coyle and Cassidy closed in the wake of the COVID-19 pandemic and merged into Connolly, but Connolly did not take Coyle and Cassidy's middle school students, who were instead directed to Our Lady of Lourdes School.

It also formerly housed St. Mary's Primary School, a Catholic elementary which opened in 1908. It was previously known as St. Mary's School and St. Mary's Elementary School. c. 2008 its enrollment was about 266; this fell to 133 in 2018. The school closed that year. Principal Michael O'Brien stated that the state of the physical plant was one factor in the school's closure. The school did not have an elevator. In addition to the physical plant factor, the diocese also no longer wished to cover the school's expenses. In 2018 it was $500,000 in debt for salaries and other items, and it also had a $1.5 million debt for 2006–2014 medical/dental insurance costs.

=== Higher education ===
Taunton is home to a satellite campus of Bristol Community College, which is located at the (former) Taunton Catholic Middle School. In addition, the city houses career schools such as the Rob Roy Academy beauty school. Bristol-Plymouth Regional Technical School offers adult education classes.

== Media ==
=== Television and radio ===
Taunton has local Public, educational, and government access (PEG) cable TV channels which include the Public-access television Taunton Community Access and Media, Inc. (Comcast Channel 15; Verizon 22), Educational television Taunton Educational Network (Comcast Channel 9; Verizon 23) which is run by the Taunton High School TV Studio and Government-access television Taunton Municipal Network (Comcast Channel 17; Verizon 24). Comcast's Taunton system carries all Providence and Boston stations as well and both markets are available over-the-air. The two radio stations based in Taunton are AM 1530/ 99.7 FM WVBF (licensed to nearby Middleborough Center), which features local programming and the Talking Information Center out of Marshfield, a non-profit radio station serving the blind and print impaired population of Massachusetts; and WSNE-FM 93.3, which primarily serves the Providence radio market and has its studios in the city of Providence.

From 1949 until 2007, Taunton was also served by local radio station WPEP-AM 1570. However, the station was silenced with the upgrade of Keating Wilcox's station also on 1570, in Beverly, Massachusetts. The city is now served by AM 1530/99.7 FM WVBF. Since August 2019, the station has been owned by Dean of the State Senate Marc R. Pacheco of Taunton, and programmed by longtime New England radio veteran Chris Keach, who started work at the station in 2010 when it was owned by Steven Callahan and managed by Tony Lopes. The AM signal now broadcasts with 5,000 watts of power, and covers a large portion of Eastern Massachusetts and Rhode Island.

=== Newspapers ===
Taunton is served by several publications including the Silver City Bulletin, Brockton Enterprise, and the Taunton Daily Gazette. Regional papers of importance such as the Boston Globe, Boston Herald, and Providence Journal, are also widely available.

=== Internet ===
Some of the major Internet providers in Taunton are Comcast, and Verizon. The Taunton Municipal Lighting Plant (TMLP), Taunton's electric company, is also an Internet service provider for the city and its surrounding towns.

== Infrastructure ==
=== Fire department ===
Taunton has 127 firefighters on the Taunton Fire Department (TFD). The TFD currently operates out of five fire stations, located throughout the city, and operates a fire apparatus fleet of five engines, three ladders, one brush unit, one dive rescue unit, two fireboats, and several other special, support, and reserve units. The current Chief of Department is Timothy J. Bradshaw.

=== Healthcare and utilities ===
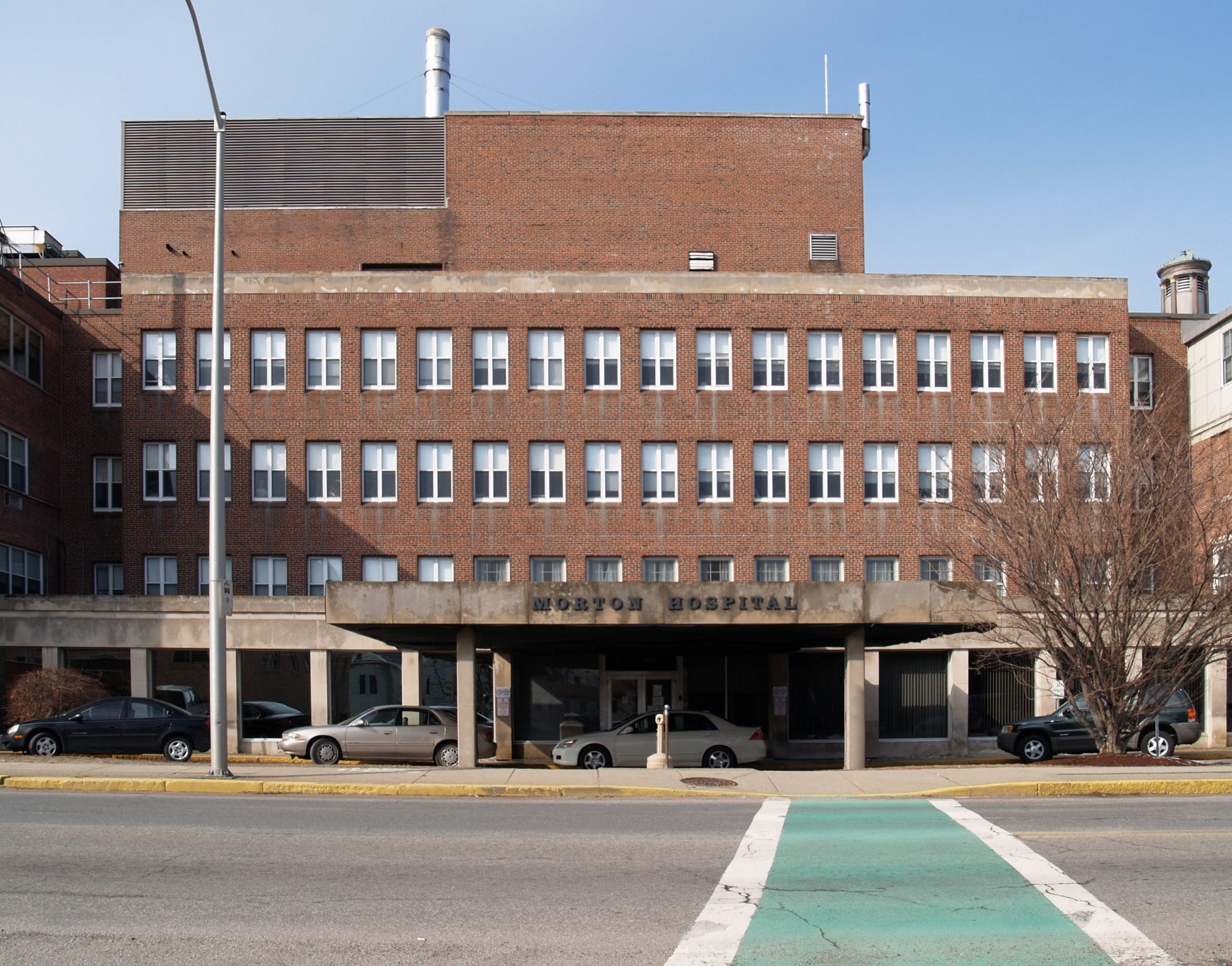
Morton Hospital

Taunton is home to the Morton Hospital and Medical Center, located on Washington Street, just north of the city center.

Taunton State Hospital is a psychiatric hospital located on Hodges Avenue. One of its historic old buildings had to be demolished after it was severely damaged by fire in 2006. This hospital is now one of the very few mental health hospitals in Massachusetts for longer-term inpatient psychiatric care.

Electricity is provided to residents by the Taunton Municipal Lighting Plant (TMLP), located in the south end. The city has a municipal water system, with a treatment plant and water supply in nearby Lakeville, as well as a public sewer system with a treatment plant on West Water Street in the south end of the city, discharging into the Taunton River.

=== Transportation ===
Taunton is the central highway hub of southeastern Massachusetts. Much of the eastern parts of the state's major highways intersect and/or run through the city, especially at its center. US 44, MA 138, and MA 140 intersect at Taunton Green, the square at Taunton's center. MA 140 is also accessible from the eastern neighborhood of the city, popularly referred to as "East Taunton." Additionally, MA 24 and MA 140 intersect near East Taunton, and it is at that junction that Route 140 ceases to be a two-lane divided freeway from the south and becomes a smaller state highway to the north. Interstate 495 runs through the northern portion of Taunton, unofficially referred to as "North Taunton", and parallel to Myles Standish Industrial Park, Taunton's main industrial park.

Various smaller routes run through other parts of the city. These include a small portion of MA 104, close to the Taunton-Raynham city limits, and MA 79, close to the Taunton-Berkley-Lakeville (Plymouth County) city-town-county limits. Taunton is the western terminus of MA 104. It merges into US 44 after entering the city.

Taunton has one MBTA Commuter Rail station – East Taunton station. The proposed second phase of the South Coast Rail project would add a stop near Downtown Taunton on Dean Street. The Greater Attleboro Taunton Regional Transit Authority (GATRA) provides bus mass transit. The Middleboro Secondary and New Bedford Main Line freight rail lines pass through Taunton.

Taunton has its own municipal airport, serving mostly smaller craft and occasional commuter jets. The nearest airport with national airline service is T.F. Green Airport in Rhode Island, and the nearest international service is at Logan International Airport in Boston.

== Sister cities ==
Taunton is a sister city of:

- Taunton, Somerset, England, United Kingdom
- Angra do Heroismo, Terceira, Azores, Portugal
- Lagoa (Azores), Sao Miguel, Azores, Portugal

== See also ==
- List of mill towns in Massachusetts
