= Van Diemen's Land (disambiguation) =

Van Diemen's Land is the former name for Tasmania.

Van Diemen's Land may also refer to:

- Darwin and Kimberley in northwestern Australia, an area known as Van Diemen's Land during the initial Dutch exploration of Australia
- Van Diemen's Land (album), a 2014 album by Russell Morris
- Van Diemen's Land (film), a film documenting Alexander Pearce's first escape
- Van Diemen's Land (folk song), a transportation ballad
- Van Diemen's Land (U2 song), a song by U2 from Rattle and Hum
- Van Diemen's Land Company, a farming corporation
- Van Diemen's Land Ensign, an unofficial merchant flag

== See also ==
- Van Diemen (disambiguation)
- Bank of Van Diemen's Land
- Van Diemen's Land v Port Phillip, 1851
