= Flag of Baton Rouge, Louisiana =

City of Baton Rouge
- Use: Other
- Proportion: 2:3
- Adopted: December 13, 1995
- Design: Cursive white text reading 'Baton Rouge' on a crimson red background. A shield in the bottom left corner contains a fleur-de-lis, a castle from the Flag of Castile, and the 1707 Union Flag
- Designed by: Baton Rouge City Council

The flag of Baton Rouge contains a red field with a small shield and cursive text reading "Baton Rouge". The current flag was adopted in 1995 by the city council, replacing an older flag that had been in use since 1968.

== Design ==
The flag has a field of crimson representing the red-colored poles erected by Native Americans along the Mississippi River from which the city's name is derived. The crest on the lower left uses the red, white and blue, representing the colors of the United States. The upper left of the shield is the fleur-de-lis representing France, the upper right is a castle taken from the flag of the Kingdom of Castile, representing Spain, and the lower portion is the pre-1801 Union Flag of the Kingdom of Great Britain. The coat of arms encompasses the emblems of the three European countries whose flags have flown over Baton Rouge. The name "Baton Rouge" in white appears prominently on the field of crimson.

== History ==
Baton Rouge's first city flag (1968–1995)

The city adopted its first flag on December 11, 1968, by recommendation of a flag committee established by mayor W. W. Dumas. It consisted of an emerald green field with the city seal in the center, which included a castle for Spain, a lion for England, and the fleur-de-lis for France. The flag was replaced by the current design on December 13, 1995.

== See also ==
- Flags of the United States
- Union Jack
