= Murray River Flag =

Australian flag

Murray River flag, also known as the "Echuca flag"

Upper Murray River flag

Lower Murray River flag

The Murray River Flag (Note: Despite South Australians generally using the expression "River Murray", the term "Murray River flag" appears universal.) is flown from paddle steamers and other vessels in the Australian States of New South Wales, Victoria and South Australia that ply the waters of the Murray-Darling river system. Little is known about the flag's early history but it may have originated as far back as 1850 when the formation of the Murray River League was announced. R. W. Beddome, founder of the League, enthused "Up with the Murray flag." No fragments of the original Murray River Flag are known to exist and three versions have passed down to the present day.

== History ==
The earliest recorded reference to the Murray River Flag was at Goolwa to honour the first vessel built in Goolwa, the Eureka on 26 August 1853. The Mary Ann, built by three brothers William, Thomas and Elliot Randell, began her voyage from Mannum downstream to Goolwa on 4 March 1853. The Murray River Flag was hoisted upon their arrival. The flag was described by a reporter of the Australian Register:

"The flag bears a red cross with four horizontal blue bars. The cross being charged with five stars as emblems of the Colonies while the upper corner, is taken up with British connections which is depicted by the Union Jack. It has been named, we understand, the Murray River Flag."

It is believed that the blue bars represent the Murray River and the three major rivers that run into it: the Murrumbidgee, Lachlan and the Darling. This quote is likely folklore as the Lachlan River is not a direct tributary of the Murray River. It joins the Murrumbidgee River in the Yanga Swamp, well before Murrumbidgee River reaches its confluence with the Murray River. The design bears a strong resemblance to other Australian flags of the 19th Century, such as the Australian Federation Flag and the National Colonial Flag for Australia.

== Modern Usage ==
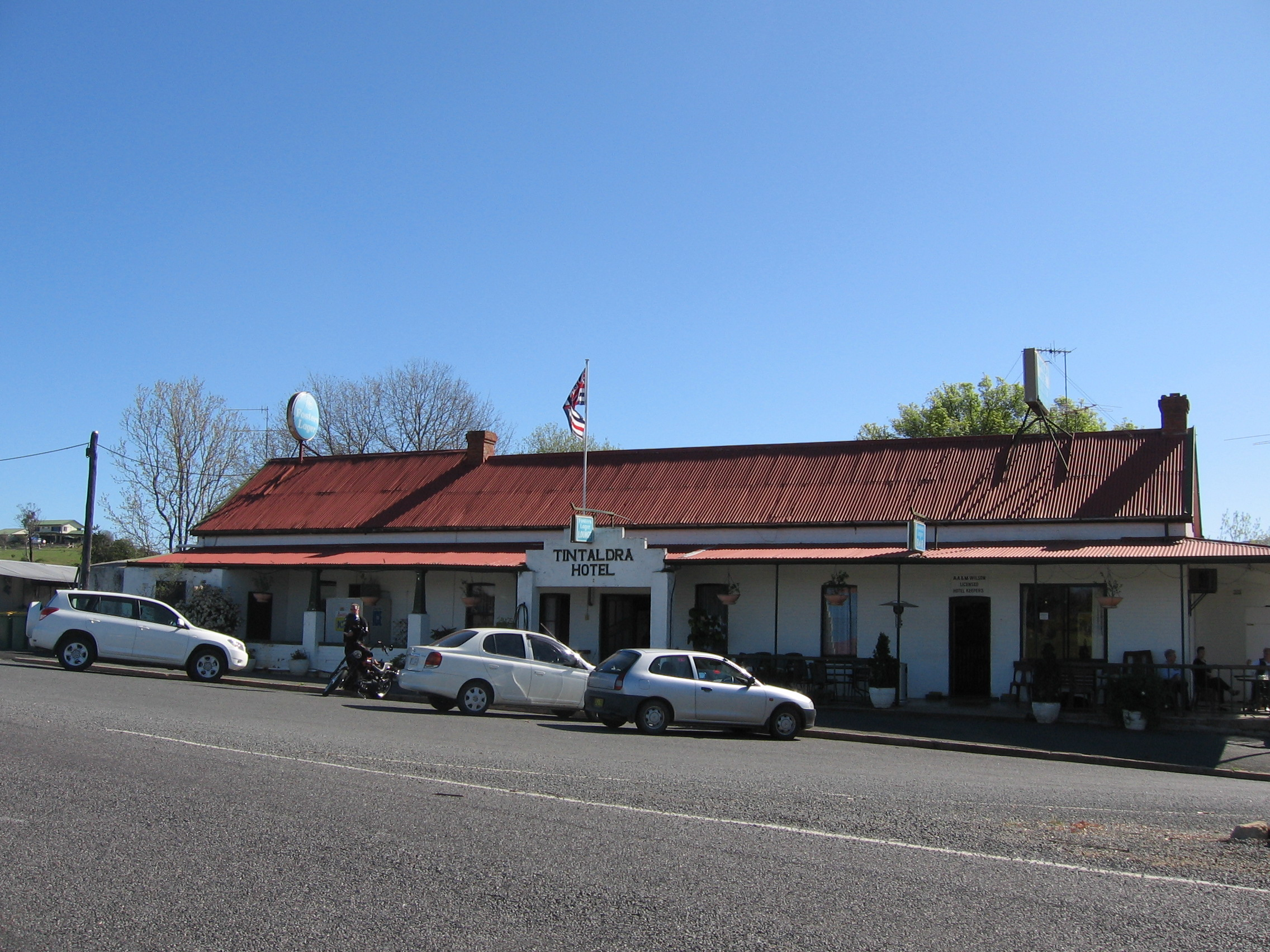
The Upper Murray flag flying above the historic Tintaldra Hotel, Tintaldra, Victoria (2008)

Today the Murray River is represented by three flags, each similar but based on different interpretations of the original description. The first, usually called the Upper Murray River flag, has the four blue stripes across the whole field of the flag apart from the Union Jack, and the cross also positioned overall, where it is on a British white ensign, a result that is close to a cross between the National Colonial Flag and the Van Diemen's Land Ensign. This design was the house flag of the Murray River Steam Navigation Co. which suggests that it is a lineal descendant of the original flag design.

The Lower Murray Flag, used predominantly in South Australia, is distinguished by the use of pale blue bands representing the lighter coloured water of the lower reaches of the Murray, but also differs from older version in separating the cross with stars (upper fly quarter) from the blue and white stripes (lower half of the flag). A version of the South Australian variant using darker blue in the stripes and also as the field of the cross with stars has been used been used in Victorian river towns, and sometimes even labelled the Upper Murray River Flag.

== Gallery ==
Lower Murray River Flag at Signal Point Cafe, Goolwa

Lower Murray River Flag on the bow of the Oscar W, Goolwa

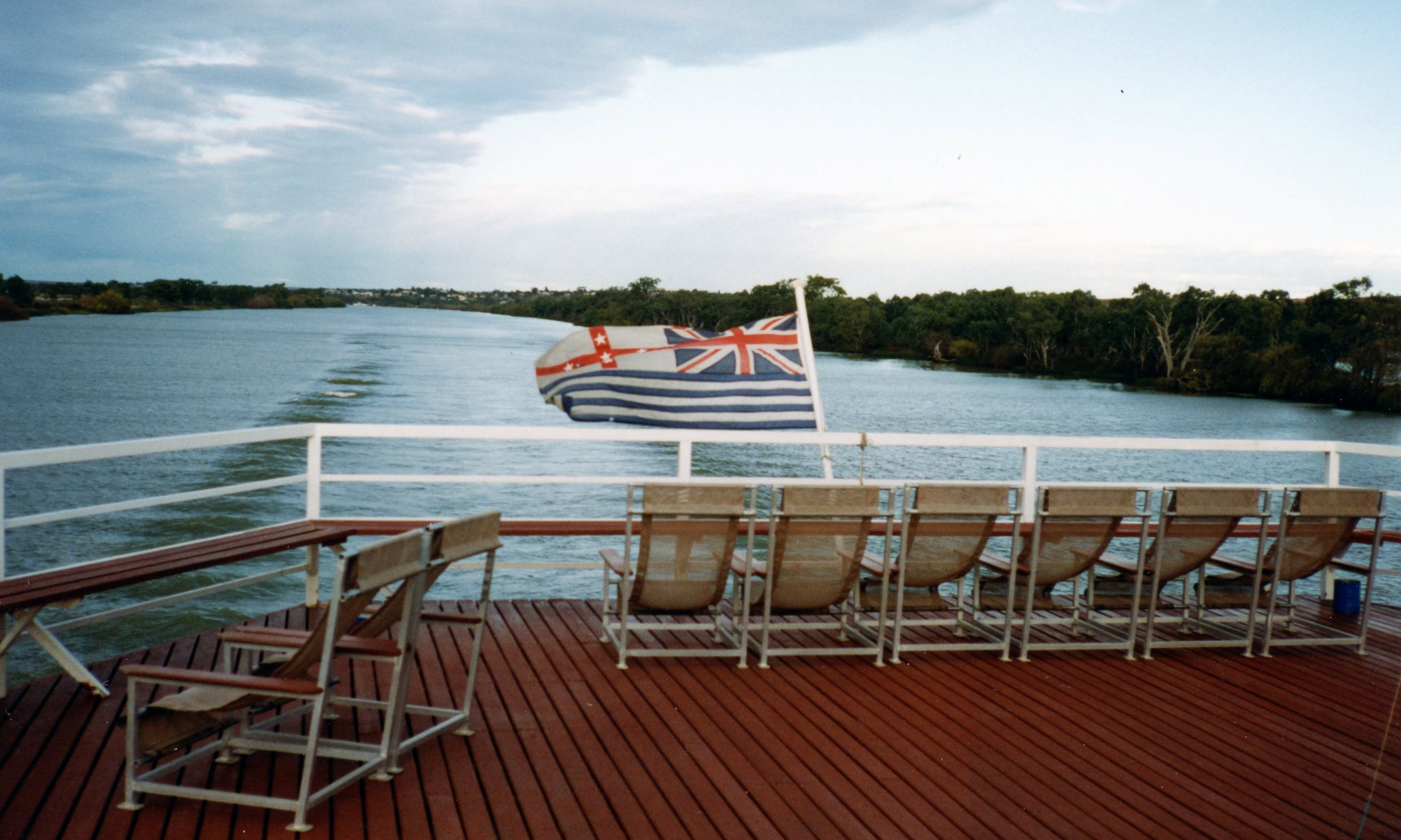
Lower Murray River Flag on the stern of the Murray River Queen

Upper Murray River Flag being present at a plaque, Swan Hill

== See also ==
- List of Australian flags
- Union Flag
