= Van Diemen (disambiguation) =

Van Diemen is a British race car manufacturer.

It may also refer to:

== People ==
- Anthony van Diemen, Dutch colonial governor
- Patrick van Diemen, a Dutch football player

== Places ==
- Van Diemen Gulf, а gulf in Australia
- Van Diemen's Land, the former name for Tasmania
- Van Diemen Strait, also known as Osumi Strait, separating Kyushu from the Nansei Islands

== See also ==
- Cape Maria van Diemen
- Van Diemen's Land (disambiguation)
