= Union Jack =

Flag of the United Kingdom

United Kingdom of Great Britain and Northern Ireland
- Use: National flag
- Proportion: 1∶2
- Adopted: 1606 (Royal decree); 1707 (National flag); 1801 (current design with St Patrick's Saltire)
- Design: Blue field on which the Cross of Saint Andrew, counterchanged with the Cross of Saint Patrick, over all the Cross of Saint George fimbriated.
- 3:5 ratio
- Use: National flag
- Proportion: 3∶5

The Union Jack or Union Flag is the national flag of the United Kingdom. While no law has been enacted making the Union Flag the national flag of the United Kingdom, it has become so through precedent.

The flag overlays three crosses, each representing a constituent country of the United Kingdom. England is represented by the red cross of Saint George edged in white, Scotland is represented by the white saltire of Saint Andrew on a blue field, and Northern Ireland is represented by the red saltire of Saint Patrick edged in white. The remaining constituent country, Wales, is not represented in the flag because the earlier flag of Great Britain was designed while Wales was part of the Kingdom of England.

The origins of the flag date to the earlier flag of Great Britain which was established in 1606 by a proclamation of King James VI and I of Scotland and England. The present design was established by an order in council following the Act of Union 1800, which joined the Kingdom of Great Britain and the Kingdom of Ireland to create the United Kingdom of Great Britain and Ireland. It was unchanged following the secession of the Irish Free State in 1922.

The flags of British Overseas Territories, as well as certain sovereign states and regions (particularly in the Commonwealth) that were previously British possessions, incorporate the Union Jack into their own flag designs or have official flags that are derived from the Union Jack. Many of these flags are Blue Ensigns or Red Ensigns with the Union Jack in the canton and defaced with the distinguishing arms of the territory. The governors of British Overseas Territories and the Australian states also have personal standards that incorporate the Union Jack in their design. The flag continues to have official status in Canada, by parliamentary resolution, where it is also known as the Royal Union Flag.

== Terminology ==
The terms Union Jack and Union Flag are both used for describing the national flag of the United Kingdom.

St Andrew's Cross; 16th cent. (Scotland)
King's Colours of 1606; 1707 (Great Britain)

St George's Cross; 16th cent. (England & Wales)
St Patrick's Cross (Ireland)
Union Flag of 1801; 1801 (United Kingdom)

Evolution of the Union Flag

Initially, the flag was termed the "British flag" or "flag of Britain", and the term "Union" first appeared in 1625. The etymology of jack in the context of flagstaffs reaches back to Middle German. The suffix -kin was used in Middle Dutch and Middle German as a diminutive. Examples occur in both Chaucer and Langland though the form is unknown in Old English. John is a common male forename (going back to the Bible), appearing in Dutch as Jan. Both languages use it as a generic form for a man in general. The two were combined in the Middle Dutch Janke, whence Middle French Jakke and Middle English Jack. Jack came to be used to identify all manner of particularly small objects or small versions of larger ones. The Oxford English Dictionary has definition III.21 "Something insignificant, or smaller than the normal size" and gives examples from 1530 to 2014 of this usage. Further examples in the compounds section at 2b illustrate this. The original maritime flag use of jack was "A ship's flag of a smaller size than the ensign, used at sea as a signal, or as an identifying device". The jack was flown in the bows or from the head of the spritsail mast to indicate the vessel's nationality: "You are alsoe for this present service to keepe in yo^{r} Jack at yo^{r} Boultspritt end and yo^{r} Pendant and yo^{r} Ordinance" The Union Flag when instantiated as a small jack became known as the "Union Jack" and this later term transferred to more general usage of the Union Flag.

Also later a short flagpole was placed in the bows of a ship to fly the jack, this became known as the jackstaff.

According to the Flag Institute, a membership-run vexillological charity, "the national flag of the United Kingdom, the Crown Dependencies and Overseas Territories is the Union Flag, which may also be called the Union Jack." The institute has also stated:

it is often stated that the Union Flag should only be described as the Union Jack when flown in the bows of a warship, but this is a relatively recent idea. From early in its life the Admiralty itself frequently referred to the flag as the Union Jack, whatever its use, and in 1902 an Admiralty circular announced that Their Lordships had decided that either name could be used officially. In 1908, a government minister stated, in response to a parliamentary question, that "the Union Jack should be regarded as the National flag".

Notwithstanding Their Lordships' circular of 1902, by 1913 the Admiralty described the "Union Flag" and added in a footnote that "A Jack is a Flag to be flown only on the 'Jack' Staff".

However, the authoritative A Complete Guide to Heraldry published in 1909 by Arthur Charles Fox-Davies uses the term "Union Jack".

The term "Union Flag" is used in King Charles I's 1634 proclamation:

... none of Our Subjects, of any of Our Nations and Kingdoms shall from henceforth presume to carry the Union Flag in the Main top, or other part of any of their Ships (that is) St Georges cross and St Andrew's Cross joined together upon pain of Our high displeasure, but that the same Union Flag be still reserved as an ornament proper for Our own Ships and Ships in our immediate Service and Pay, and none other.

— Proclamation appointing the Flag, as well for Our Navy Royal as for the Ships of Our Subjects of South and North Britain – 5 May 1634

and in King George III's proclamation of 1 January 1801 concerning the arms and flag of the United Kingdom of Great Britain and Ireland:

And that the Union Flag shall be Azure, the Crosses Saltires of St. Andrew and St. Patrick Quarterly per Saltire, counterchanged Argent and Gules; the latter fimbriated of the Second, surmounted by the Cross of St. George of the Third, fimbriated as the Saltire : ...

— A Proclamation Declaring His Majesty's Pleasure concerning the Royal Style and Titles appertaining to the Imperial Crown of the United Kingdom of Great Britain and Ireland, and its Dependencies, and also the Ensigns, Armorial Flags, and Banners thereof

When the first flag representing Britain was introduced on the proclamation of King James I in 1606, it became known simply as the "British flag" or the "flag of Britain". The royal proclamation gave no distinctive name to the new flag. At the funeral of King James in 1625 the flag was called the "Banner of the Union of the two Crosses of England and Scotland". The word jack was in use before 1600 to describe the maritime bow flag. By 1627 a small Union Jack was commonly flown in this position. One theory goes that for some years it would have been called simply the "Jack", or "Jack flag", or the "King's Jack", but by 1674, while formally referred to as "His Majesty's Jack", it was commonly called the "Union Jack", and this was officially acknowledged.

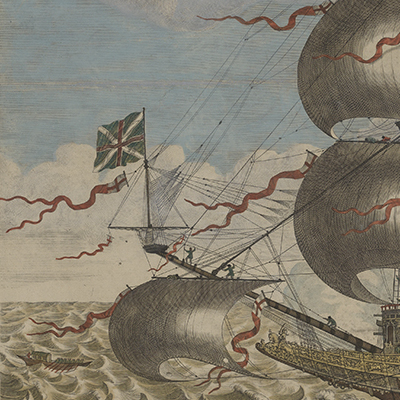
A portrait of a ship, with the Union Jack placed on a jackstaff at the ship's bow, 1637

A proclamation issued by King George III at the time of the Union of 1801 concerned flags at sea and repeatedly referred to "Ensigns, Flags, Jacks, and Pendants" and forbade merchant vessels from wearing "Our Jack, commonly called the Union Jack" nor any pendants or colours used by the King's ships. Reinforcing the distinction the King's proclamation of the same day concerning the arms and flag of the United Kingdom (not colours at sea) called the new flag "the Union Flag".

The size and power of the Royal Navy internationally at the time could also explain why the flag was named the "Union Jack"; considering the navy was so widely utilised and renowned by the United Kingdom and colonies, it is possible that the term jack occurred because of its regular use on all British ships using the jackstaff (a flag pole attached to the bow of a ship). The name may alternatively come from the "jack-et" of the English or Scottish soldiers, or from the name of James I who originated the first union in 1603. Even if the term Union Jack does derive from the jack flag, after three centuries, it is now sanctioned by use and has appeared in official use, confirmed as the national flag by Parliament and remains the popular term.

Winston Churchill, British Prime Minister from 1940 to 1945, referred to the flag of the United Kingdom as the Union Jack. In March 1899, Churchill wrote to his mother from India about her plans to produce a new trans-Atlantic magazine, to be called The Anglo-Saxon Review. The drawing at the end of this letter was deliberately facetious, teasing her for going down-market, and in the accompanying letter he wrote, "Your title 'The Anglo Saxon' with its motto 'Blood is thicker than water' only needs the Union Jack & the Star Spangled Banner crossed on the cover to be suited to one of Harmsworth's cheap Imperialist productions."

More recently, Reed's Nautical Almanac (1990 edition) unambiguously stated: "The Union Flag, frequently but incorrectly referred to as the Union Jack, ..." and later: "8. The Jack – A small flag worn on a jackstaff on the stem of Naval Vessels. The Royal Navy wears the Union Flag ... This is the only occasion when it correct to describe the flag as the Union Jack". However, this assertion does not appear in any Reed's Nautical Almanac since 1993. In the 2016 Reed's Nautical Almanac, the only entry where this might appear, section 5.21, covering Flag Etiquette, does not include this statement. Within the Almanac, neither the Union Flag nor the Union Jack are included pictorially or mentioned by name.

According to Google Trends, from 2004 to 2026, the term "Union Jack" saw more web queries in Google Search than the term "Union Flag".

For comparison with another anglophone country with a large navy, jack of the United States specifically refers to the flag flown from the jackstaff of a warship, auxiliary or other U.S. governmental entity.

The Butcher's Apron is a pejorative term for the flag, common amongst Irish republicans, citing the blood-streaked appearance of the flag and referring to atrocities committed in Ireland and other countries under British colonial rule. In 2006, Sandra White, a Member of the Scottish Parliament, caused a furore when the term was used in a press release under her name. It was later blamed on the actions of a researcher, who resigned yet claimed that the comment had been approved by White. The Irish folk band the Wolfe Tones has a song entitled "The Butcher's Apron" which makes reference to the term.

In the Chinese language, the flag has the nickname Rice-Character Flag (米字旗; Mandarin Pinyin: mǐzìqí, Cantonese Jyutping: mai5zi6kei4) because the pattern looks similar to the Chinese character for "rice" (米).

== Design ==
Construction diagram of the Union Jack, as described in the 1801 blazon

=== Specification ===
The current flag's design has been in use since 1801. Its original blazon, as decreed by George III of the United Kingdom on 1 January 1801, reads:

the Union flag shall be azure, the crosses-saltires of St. Andrew and St. Patrick quartered per saltire counter changed argent and gules; the latter fimbriated of the second [viz., argent]; surmounted by the cross of St. George of the third [viz., gules], fimbriated as the saltire [viz., argent].

The three-component crosses that make up the Union Jack are sized as follows:

- The red St George's Cross width is 1/5 of the flag's height with a 1/15 flag height fimbriation
- The white diagonal St Andrew's Cross width is 1/5 of the flag's height, visible on either side of the St Patrick's Cross in diagonals of 1/10 and 1/30 of the flag's height, respectively.
- The red diagonal St Patrick's Cross width is 1/15 of the flag's height. It is offset by 1/30 of the flag's height in an anti-clockwise direction. According to the official blazon of 1801, the white diagonal St Andrew's Cross is in fact counterchanged with the red diagonal of St Patrick's Cross. In this interpretation, the width of both saltires is 1/15 of the flag's height, with fimbriations of 1/30 of the flag's height on either side of the red saltire.

The crosses and fimbriations retain their thickness relative to the flag's height whether they are shown with a ratio of 3:5 or 1:2. Height here is the distance from top to bottom which in vexillology is termed width or breadth.

=== Ratios ===
1:2 ratio Union Flag

1:2 ratio construction sheet

3:5 ratio Union Flag

3:5 ratio construction sheet

5:8 ratio Union Flag

5:8 ratio construction sheet

2:3 ratio Union Flag

2:3 ratio construction sheet

The two ratios commonly used to size the Union Jack are 1:2 and 3:5. The Royal Navy's flag code book, BR20 Flags of All Nations, states that both 1:2 and 3:5 versions are official.

The Union Jack is normally twice as long as it is tall, a ratio of 1:2. This was the proportion set by the Admiralty around 1837 and remains the proportion used at sea and by the Royal Navy.

However, in the United Kingdom, flags used on land are normally a ratio of 3:5 and this is the ratio recommended for use on land by the College of Arms and the Flag Institute. In 2008, MP Andrew Rosindell proposed a Ten Minute Rule bill to standardise the design of the flag at 3:5, but the bill did not proceed past the first reading.

The British Army uses a Union Flag in the ratio of 5:8, sized 12 by 7.5 feet (3.7 m × 2.3 m), at its flag stations on specified days such as royal birthdays, and in a 2:3 ratio, sized 6 by 4 feet (1.8 m × 1.2 m), on other days. The King's Colours are Union Flags (referred to as the 'Great Union') defaced with the battle honours of each regiment (Note: Except in the Guards Division where a defaced Union Jack is the regimental colour.) and are in a ratio of 4:5, sized 36 by 45 inches (910 mm × 1,140 mm).

=== Colours ===
Although the proclamation of 1801 did not specify colours beyond azure, argent and gules (blue, silver/white and red, respectively), the Garter King of Arms, under the authority of the Earl Marshal, has approved the below shades of royal blue, red and white as an accurate representation:

Scheme	Blue	Red	White
Refs.			
Pantone (paper)	280 C	186 C	Safe
RGB hexadecimal	#012169	#C8102E	#FFFFFF
RGB decimal	1, 33, 105	200, 16, 46	255, 255, 255
MoD	8711D	8711	8711J
NSN	8305.99.130.4580	8305.99.130.4584	8305.99.130.4585
CMYK	100.85.5.22	2.100.85.6	0.0.0.0

The defunct British Colour Council assigned the colours 'Union Jack Blue' (BCC 218) and 'Union Jack Red' (BCC 210).

=== Flying ===
The flag does not have reflection symmetry due to the slight pinwheeling of the St Patrick's and St Andrew's crosses, technically the counterchange of saltires. Thus, there is a correct side up. It is one of two national flags with two-fold rotational symmetry, symmetry group C_{2}, the other being the flag of Trinidad and Tobago. The original specification of the Union Flag in the royal proclamation of 1 January 1801 did not contain a drawn pattern or express which way the saltires should lie; they were simply "counterchanged" and the red saltire fimbriated. Nevertheless, a convention was soon established which accords most closely with the description. The flag was deliberately designed with the Irish saltire slightly depressed at the hoist end to reflect the earlier union with Scotland, giving as it were seniority to the Saint Andrew's cross.

When statically displayed, the hoist is on the observer's left. To fly the flag correctly, the white of St Andrew is above the red of St Patrick in the upper hoist canton (the quarter at the top nearest to the flag-pole). This is expressed by the phrases wide white top and broadside up. An upside-down flag must be turned over to be flown correctly; rotating it 180 degrees will still result in an upside-down flag.

The first drawn pattern for the flag was in a parallel proclamation on 1 January 1801, concerning civil naval ensigns, which drawing shows the Red Ensign (also to be used as a red jack by privateers). As it appears in the London Gazette, the broad stripe is where expected for three of the four quarters, but the upper left quarter shows the broad stripe below.

It is often stated that a flag upside down is a form of distress signal or even a deliberate insult. In the case of the Union Flag, the difference is subtle and is easily missed by the uninformed. It is often displayed upside down inadvertently—even on commercially-made hand waving flags.

Staff from the left

Staff from the right

Correct vertical displays of the Union Flag. The left view is also the vertical display if only viewed from one direction and no staff/bi-supported staff is used

Hoist on the left

Hoist on the right

Correct horizontal displays of the Union Flag. The left view is also the horizontal display if only viewed from one direction

Hoist on the left

Hoist on the right

Incorrect horizontal displays of the Union Flag. The flag can be mistakenly flown upside down, as shown

== History ==
In 1603, James VI of Scotland inherited the Kingdom of England (and the newly created client state, the Kingdom of Ireland) as James I, thereby uniting the crowns in a personal union. With Wales annexed into the Kingdom of England under the Laws in Wales Acts 1535 and 1542, James now ruled over all of the island of Great Britain, which he frequently described as a unified kingdom (though the parliaments of the Kingdom of England and the Kingdom of Scotland did not actually unify until the Kingdom of Great Britain was formed in 1707). In the wake of the 1603 personal union, several designs for a new flag were drawn up, juxtaposing the Saint George's Cross and the St Andrew's Saltire, but none were acceptable to James:

Early (c. 1604) design proposals (manuscript in the National Library of Scotland)

Other design proposals, c. early 17th century
One early proposal for the Union Jack, consisting of a white St Andrew's saltire with blue fimbriation superimposed over a red St George's Cross on a field of white

A reconstruction of the Union Jack displayed on the ceiling boss from Linlithgow Palace

Some Scots vessels flew an unofficial version of the 1606 Union Jack that laid the St Andrew's Cross over the St George's Cross

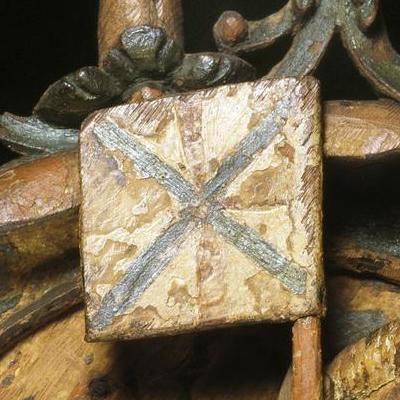
Linlithgow Palace ceiling boss with conjoined flag design, c. 1617

Various other designs for a common flag were drawn up following the union of the two Crowns in 1603, but were rarely, if ever, used. One version showed St George's Cross with St Andrew's Cross in the canton, and another version placed the two crosses side by side.

A painted wooden ceiling boss from Linlithgow Palace, dated to about 1617, depicts the Scottish royal unicorn holding a flag where a blue Saltire surmounts the red cross of St. George.

=== 1606–1801 ===
The first Union Flag from 1606

On 12 April 1606, a new flag to represent the regal union between England and Scotland was specified in a royal decree, according to which the flag of England (a red cross on a white background, known as St George's Cross), and the flag of Scotland (a white saltire on a blue background, known as the saltire or St Andrew's Cross), would be joined together, forming the flag of Great Britain and first union flag:

By the King: Whereas, some differences hath arisen between Our subjects of South and North Britaine travelling by Seas, about the bearing of their Flagges: For the avoiding of all contentions hereafter. We have, with the advice of our Council, ordered: That from henceforth all our Subjects of this Isle and Kingdome of Great Britaine, and all our members thereof, shall beare in their main-toppe the Red Crosse, commonly called St George's Crosse, and the White Crosse, commonly called St Andrew's Crosse, joyned together according to the forme made by our heralds, and sent by Us to our Admerall to be published to our Subjects: and in their fore-toppe our Subjects of South Britaine shall weare the Red Crosse onely as they were wont, and our Subjects of North Britaine in their fore-toppe the White Crosse onely as they were accustomed.

This royal flag was, at first, to be used only at sea on civil and military ships of both England and Scotland, whereas land forces continued to use their respective national banners. Flying the national flag at the mainmast had signified the Admiral of the Narrow Seas (the English Channel) and confusion arose. In 1634, King Charles I restricted its use to Royal Navy ships. After the Acts of Union 1707, the flag gained a regularised status as "the ensign armorial of the Kingdom of Great Britain", the newly created state. It was then adopted by land forces as well, although the blue field used on land-based versions more closely resembled that of the blue of the flag of Scotland.

Various shades of blue have been used in the saltire over the years. The ground of the current Union Flag is a deep "navy" blue (Pantone 280), which can be traced to the colour used for the Blue Ensign of the Royal Navy's historic "Blue Squadron". (Dark shades of colour were used on maritime flags on the basis of durability.) In 2003 a committee of the Scottish Parliament recommended that the flag of Scotland use a lighter "royal" blue (Pantone 300) (the Office of the Lord Lyon does not detail specific shades of colour for use in heraldry).

A thin white stripe, or fimbriation, separates the red cross from the blue field, in accordance with heraldry's rule of tincture where colours (such as red and blue) must be separated from each other by metals (such as white, i.e. argent or silver). The blazon for the old Union Flag, to be compared with the current flag, is azure, the cross saltire of St Andrew argent surmounted by the Cross of St George gules, fimbriated of the second.

The Protectorate Jack, flag used by The Protectorate from 1658 to 1660

The Kingdom of Ireland, which had existed as a personal union with England since 1541, was unrepresented in the original versions of the Union Jack. However, the flag of the Protectorate from 1658 to 1660 was inescutcheoned with the arms of Ireland. These were removed at the Restoration, because Charles II found them offensive.

The original flag appears in the canton of the Commissioners' Ensign of the Northern Lighthouse Board. This is the only contemporary official representation of the pre-1801 Union Jack in the United Kingdom and can be seen flying from their George Street headquarters in Edinburgh.

It is this version of the Union Jack that formed the canton of the Continental Union Flag, the "de facto" first national flag of the United States from July 1776 to June 1777.

Union Jack from HMS Queen Charlotte, the Royal Navy flagship during the Glorious First of June, 1794. As was common for the period, the flag is an approximation of the correct specification

Digital recreation of the flag

Lord Howe's action, or the Glorious First of June, painted in 1795, shows a Union flying from HMS Queen Charlotte on the "Glorious First of June" 1794. The actual flag, preserved in the National Maritime Museum, is a cruder approximation of the proper specifications; this was common in 18th and early 19th century flags.

The flag is also flown beside Customs House in Loftus Street, Sydney, to mark the raising of the Union Jack by Captain Phillip at Sydney Cove, the site of the first British settlement in New South Wales and Australia in 1788. On the plaque it is referred to as the "Jack of Queen Anne".

The flag of the British Army is the Union Jack, however in 1938 a "British Army Non-Ceremonial Flag" was devised, featuring a crowned golden lion, statant guardant, surmounting the royal crown, overlying two crossed swords on a red background, (the word "Army" in gold letters sometimes appears below this motif). This is not the equivalent of the ensigns of the other armed services but is used at recruiting and military or sporting events, when the army needs to be identified but the reverence and ceremony due to the regimental flags and the Union Jack would be considered inappropriate.

==== Scottish Union Flag ====
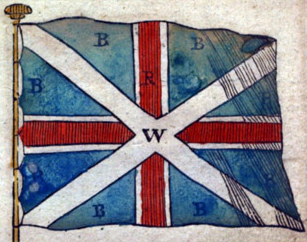
Scottish Union Flag depicted in the 1704 edition of The Present State of the Universe.

In objecting to the design of the Union Flag adopted in 1606, whereby the cross of Saint George surmounted that of Saint Andrew, a number of owners and masters of merchant vessels in the Kingdom of Scotland raised the issue with John Erskine, 19th Earl of Mar, and were encouraged by him to send a letter of complaint to James VI, via the Privy Council of Scotland, which stated:

Most sacred Soverayne. A greate nomber of the maisteris and awnaris of the schippis of this your Majesteis kingdome hes verie havelie compleint to your Majesteis Counsell that the form and patrone of the flaggis of schippis, send doun heir and commandit to be ressavit and used be the subjectis of boith kingdomes, is very prejudiciall to the fredome and dignitie of this Estate and will gif occasioun of reprotche to this natioun quhairevir the said flage sal happin to be worne beyond sea becaus, as your sacred majestie may persave, the Scottis Croce, callit Sanctandrois Croce is twyse divydit, and the Inglishe Croce, callit Sanct George, haldin haill and drawne through the Scottis Croce, whiche is thairby obscurit and no takin nor merk to be seen of the Scottis Armes. This will breid some heit and miscontentment betwix your Majesteis subjectis, and it is to be ferit that some inconvenientis sall fall out betwix thame, for oure seyfairing men cannot be inducit to ressave that flag as it is set doun. They haif drawne two new drauchtis and patronis as most indifferent for boith kingdomes which they present to the Counsell, and craved our approbatioun of the same; bot we haif reserved that to you Majesteis princelie determination.

Although documents accompanying this complaint which contained drafts for alternative designs have been lost, evidence exists, at least on paper, of an unofficial Scottish variant, whereby the Scottish cross was uppermost. There is reason to think that cloth flags of this design were employed during the 17th century for unofficial use on Scottish vessels at sea. This flag's design is also described in the 1704 edition of The Present State of the Universe by John Beaumont, which contains as an appendix The Ensigns, Colours or Flags of the Ships at Sea: Belonging to The several Princes and States in the World.

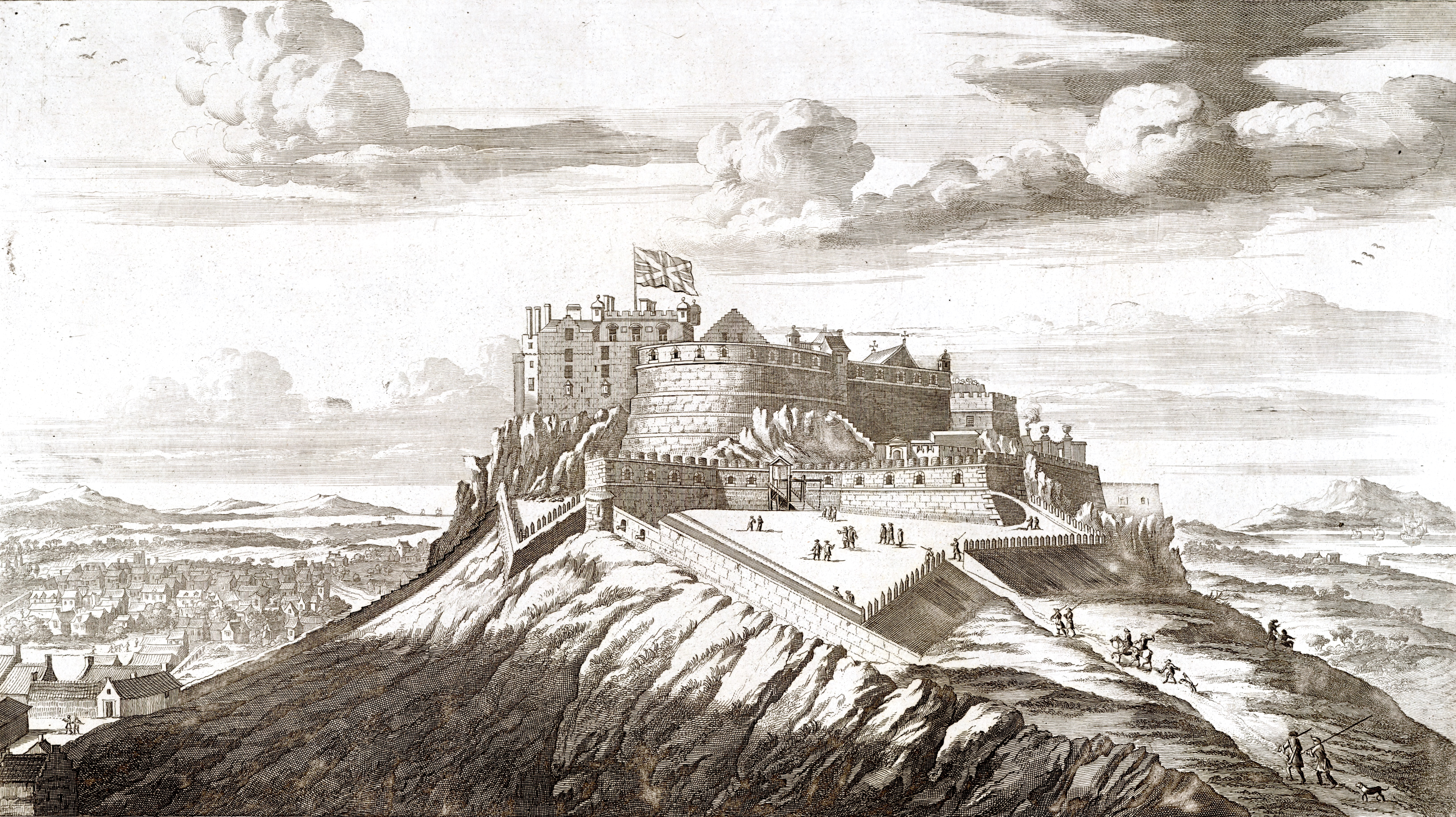
Slezer's Edinburgh Castle c. 1693 depicting the Scottish Union flag

On land, evidence confirming the use of this flag appears in the depiction of Edinburgh Castle by John Slezer, in his series of engravings entitled Theatrum Scotiae, c. 1693. Appearing in later editions of Theatrum Scotiae, the North East View of Edinburgh Castle engraving depicts the Scotch (to use the appropriate adjective of that period) version of the Union Flag flying from the Palace block of the Castle. On The North Prospect of the City of Edenburgh engraving, the flag is indistinct.

On 17 April 1707, two weeks prior to the Acts of Union coming into effect, and with Sir Henry St George, the younger, the Garter King of Arms, having presented several designs of flag to Queen Anne and her Privy Council for consideration, the flag for the soon to be unified Kingdom of Great Britain was chosen. At the suggestion of the Scots representatives, the designs for consideration included that version of Union Jack showing the Cross of Saint Andrew uppermost; identified as being the "Scotts union flagg as said to be used by the Scotts". However, the Queen and her Council approved Sir Henry's original effort, numbered "one".

A manuscript compiled in 1785 by William Fox and in possession of the Flag Research Center includes a full plate showing "the scoth [sic] union" flag. This could imply that there was still some use of a Scottish variant before the addition of the cross of St Patrick to the Union Flag in 1801.

=== After 1801 ===
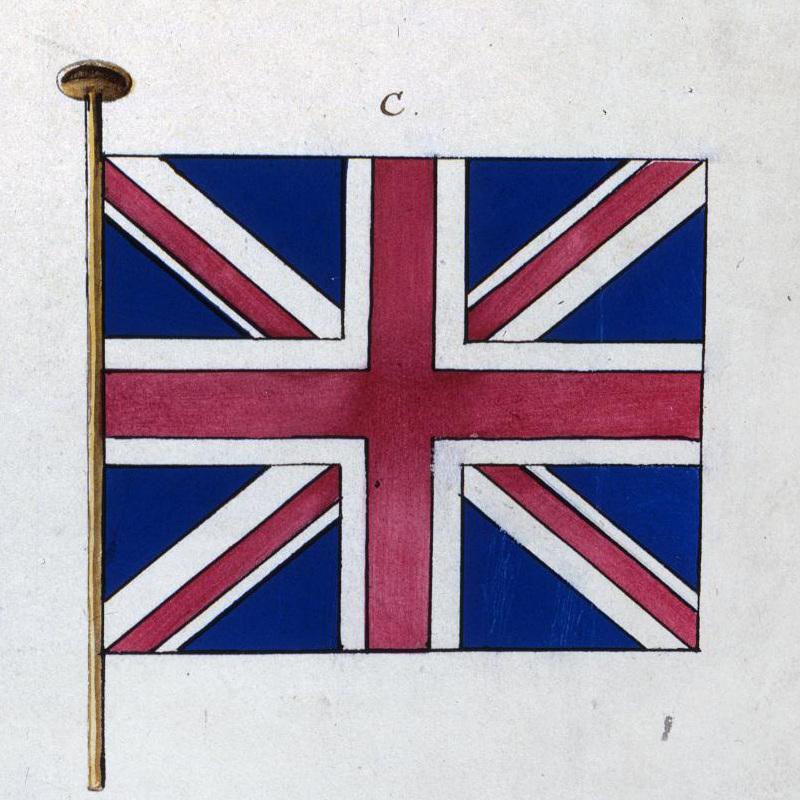
The Union Flag prepared by the College of Arms for the approval of George III.

Digital recreation of the flag

The current and second Union Jack dates from 1 January 1801 with the Act of Union 1800, which merged the Kingdom of Great Britain and the Kingdom of Ireland to form the United Kingdom of Great Britain and Ireland. The new design added a red saltire, the cross of Saint Patrick (which originates from the arms of the Old English FitzGerald family rather than directly from the saint), for Ireland. This is counterchanged with the saltire of St Andrew, such that the red always follows the white clockwise. The arrangement has introduced a requirement to display the flag "the right way up" (see specifications for flag use above). As with the red cross, so too the red saltire is separated by a white fimbriation from the blue field. This fimbriation is repeated for symmetry on the white portion of the saltire, which thereby appears wider than the red portion. The fimbriation of the cross of St George separates its red from the red of the saltire.

==== Flag speculation after Irish Free State establishment ====
When the Anglo-Irish Treaty was concluded on 6 December 1921 and the creation of the new Irish Free State was an imminent prospect, the question arose as to whether the cross of Saint Patrick should remain in the Union Jack. The New York Times reported that on 22 January 1922:

At the College of Arms it was stated that certain modifications were under consideration and that if any action were taken it would be done by the King in Council. No parliamentary action would be necessary. Heraldry experts say that alterations in arms are very expensive. Some years ago there was a demand from Irish quarters that the blue ground of the golden harp on the royal standard should be changed to green. It was then estimated that the alteration would cost at least £2,000,000. To remove all reference to Ireland from the present Union Jack and Royal Arms would be vastly more expensive.

There was some speculation on the matter in British dominions also, with one New Zealand paper reporting that:

...the removal of the cross of St. Patrick Cross after 120 years will transform the appearance of the flag. It will certainly become a flag under which great victories were won in the seventeenth and eighteenth centuries, but to most minds the sentimental loss will be great. Probably it will be found that the deletion is not absolutely necessary. Other possible changes include the abolition of the title of the United Kingdom, and the removal of the harp from the Royal Standard and the Coat of Arms, and the substitution of the Ulster emblem.

However, the fact that it was likely that Northern Ireland would remain in the United Kingdom gave better grounds for keeping the cross of St. Patrick in the Union Jack. In this regard, Sir James Craig, the Prime Minister of Northern Ireland remarked in December 1921 that he and his government were "glad to think that our decision [to remain part of United Kingdom] will obviate the necessity of mutilating the Union Jack." Though remaining within the United Kingdom, the new government of Northern Ireland dispensed with the St Patrick's Saltire in favour of a new flag derived from the coat-of-arms of the Burkes, Earls of Ulster, and quite similar to England's St George's Cross.

Ultimately, when the British home secretary was asked on 7 December 1922 (the day after the Irish Free State was established) whether the Garter King of Arms was "to issue any Regulations with reference to the national flag consequent to the passing of the Irish Free State Constitution Act", the response was no and the flag has never been changed.

A Dáil question in 1961 mooted raising the removal of the cross of St Patrick with the British government; Frank Aiken, the Irish Minister for External Affairs, declined to "waste time on heraldic disputations".

==== 21st century ====
One suggested redesign of the Union Jack with the red dragon from the flag of Wales added in the centre

The lack of any Welsh symbol or colours in the flag is a result of Wales having been considered an integral part of the Kingdom of England at the time the flag of Great Britain was created in 1606. Since there is no Welsh element in the Union Jack, Wrexham's Labour MP Ian Lucas proposed on 26 November 2007 in a House of Commons debate that the Union Flag be combined with the Welsh flag to reflect Wales's status within the UK, and that the red dragon be added to the Union Flag's red, white, and blue pattern. He said the Union Jack currently only represented the other three UK nations, and Minister for Culture, Creative Industries and Tourism Margaret Hodge conceded that Lucas had raised a valid point for debate. She said, "the Government is keen to make the Union Flag a positive symbol of Britishness reflecting the diversity of our country today and encouraging people to take pride in our flag." This development sparked design contests with entries from all over the world.

In the run-up to the 2014 Scottish independence referendum, various non-official suggestions were made for how the flag could be redesigned without the St Andrew's Cross if Scotland left the Union. However, as Scotland voted against independence, the issue did not arise.

=== Development and variants, 1606–1801 ===
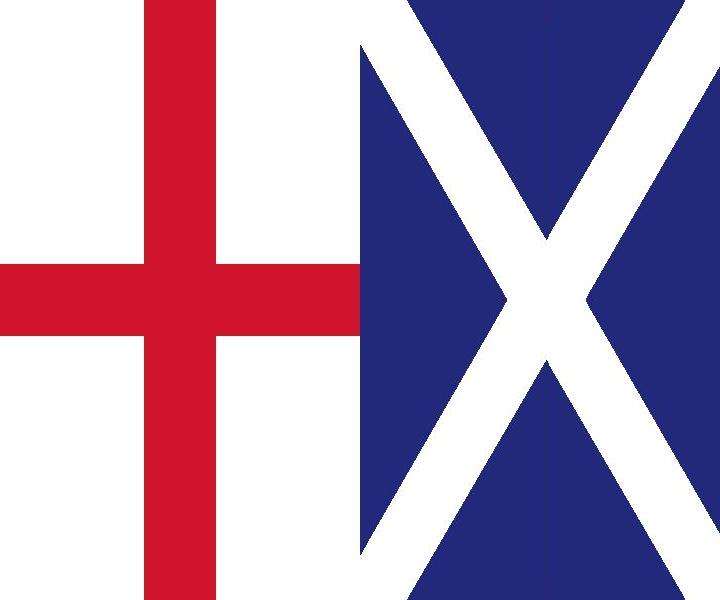
Coat of arms of Ireland; 17th c. (Ireland)	St George's Cross; 16th c. (England, incl. Wales)	St Andrew's Cross; 16th c. (Scotland)
Flag of the Commonwealth; 1649 (Commonwealth of England)	English Naval Jack; Royal Navy; 1643 (England)	Scottish Union Flag (Unofficial); 1606 (Scotland)
Union Flag of 1606; 1606 (Union of the Crowns); 1660 (Restoration); 1707 (Great Britain)	St Patrick's Cross (Historical); 17th c. (Ireland)
Flag of the Commonwealth and Protectorate Jack; 1658 (Commonwealth of England)	Union Flag of 1801; 1801 (United Kingdom)

== Status in the United Kingdom ==
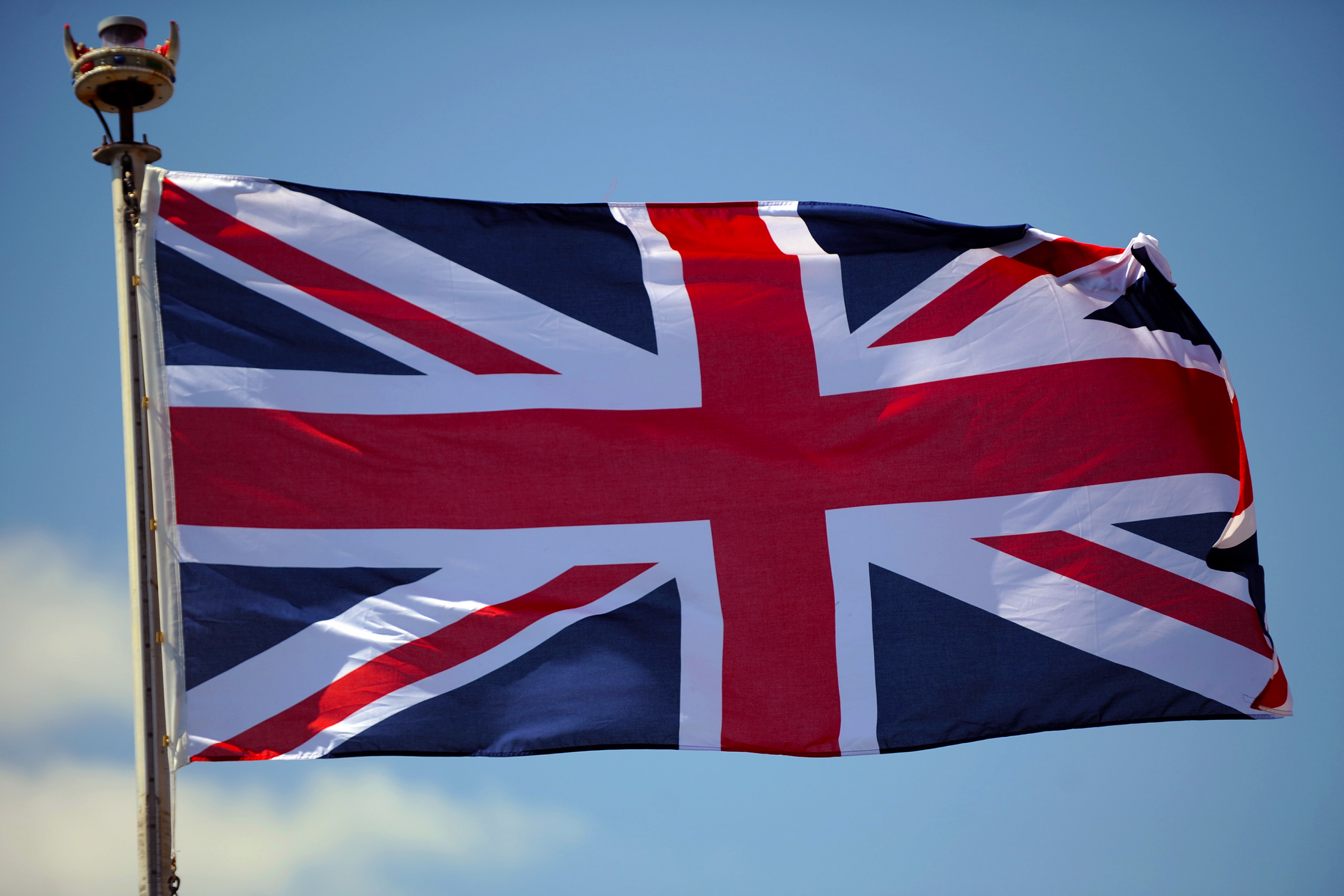
A Union Jack flying from a jackstaff onboard a Royal Navy warship, 2011

The Union Jack is used as a jack by commissioned warships and submarines of the Royal Navy, and by commissioned army and Royal Air Force vessels. When at anchor or alongside, it is flown from the jackstaff at the bow of the ship. When a ship is underway, the Union Jack is only flown from the jackstaff when the ship is dressed for a special occasion, such as the King's official birthday.

The Union Flag is worn at the masthead of a ship to indicate the presence of an Admiral of the Fleet, former First Sea Lords and Admirals who are or have been Chief of Defence Staff. On the day on which a court-martial is to sit, the Union Flag is to be hoisted at the peak or at the yardarm as appropriate and a gun is to be fired when colours are hoisted, or at the time the signal is made if the court is ordered to sit immediately.

The Royal Standard is flown when the Sovereign embarks in a warship. When other members of the Royal family embark they fly their own personal standard, which is usually a modified version of the Royal Standard.

No law has been passed making the Union Jack the national flag of the United Kingdom: it has become one through precedent. Its first recorded recognition as a national flag came in 1908, when it was stated in Parliament that "the Union Jack should be regarded as the National flag". A more categorical statement was made by Home Secretary Sir John Gilmour, in 1933 when he stated that "the Union Flag is the national flag and may properly be flown by any British subject on land."

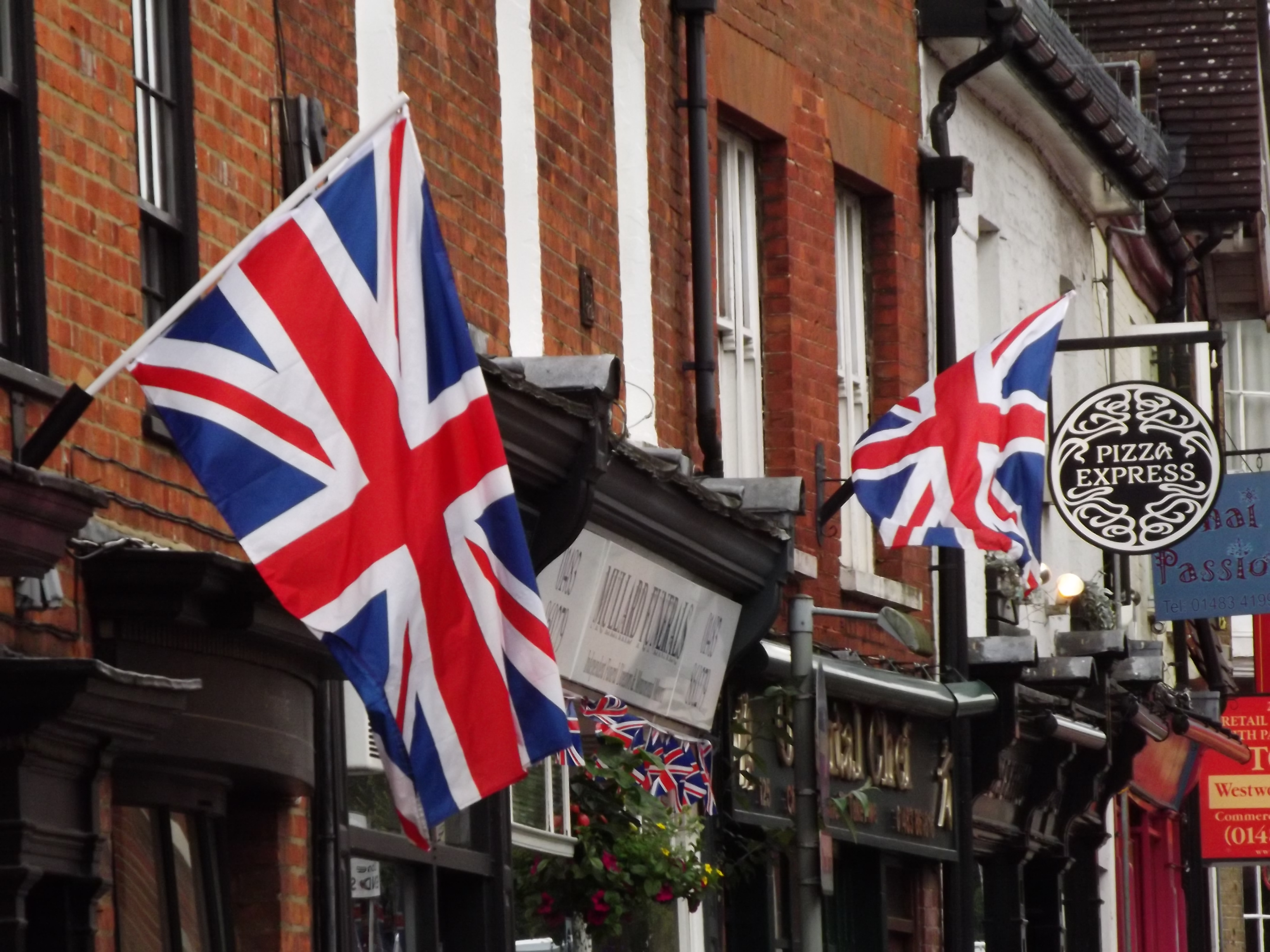
Union Jacks on two flagpoles hanging from a building in Surrey, 2012

Civilian use is permitted on land, but use of the unmodified flag at sea is restricted to military vessels. Unauthorised use of the flag in the 17th century to avoid paying harbour duties – a privilege restricted to naval ships – caused James's successor, Charles I, to order that use of the flag on naval vessels be restricted to His Majesty's ships "upon pain of Our high displeasure." It remains a criminal offence under the Merchant Shipping Act 1995 to display the Union Flag (other than the "pilot jack" – see below) from a British ship. Naval ships will fly the White Ensign, merchant and private boats can fly the Red Ensign, others with special permission such as naval yacht clubs can fly the Blue Ensign. All of the coloured ensigns contain the Union Flag as part of the design.

The Court of the Lord Lyon, which has legal jurisdiction in heraldic matters in Scotland, confirms that the Union Jack "is the correct flag for all citizens and corporate bodies of the United Kingdom to fly to demonstrate their loyalty and their nationality."

On 5 February 2008, Conservative Member of Parliament (MP) Andrew Rosindell introduced the 'Union Flag Bill' as a private member's bill under the 10 Minute Rule in the House of Commons. The Bill sought to formalise the position of the Union Flag as the national flag of the UK in law, to remove legal obstacles to its regular display. The Bill did not receive its second reading by the end of that parliamentary session. The Bill stated "Union flag (commonly known as the Union Jack)" in subsection 1(1), but otherwise uses the term "Union Flag".

=== Flag days ===
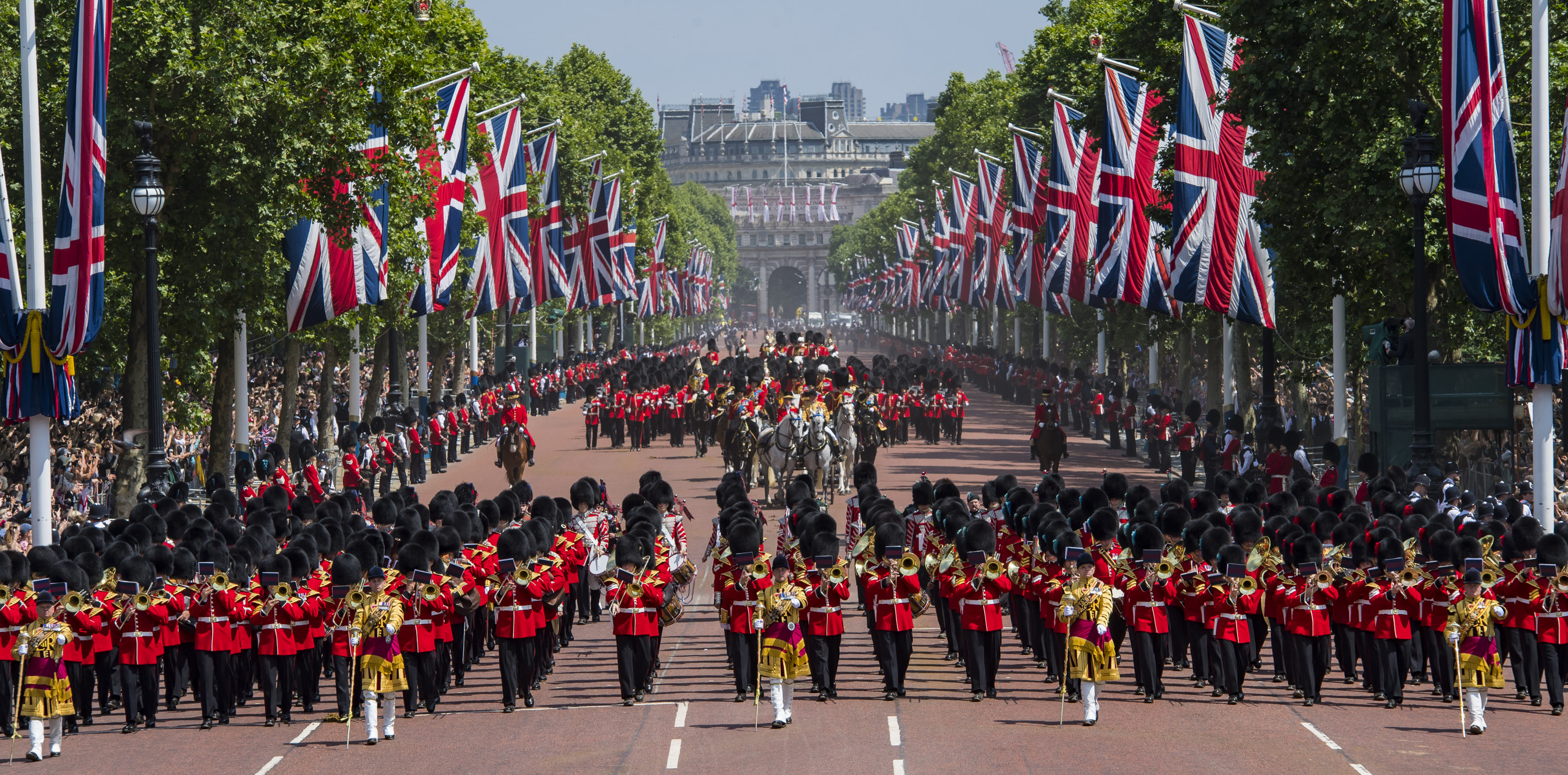
Vertical displays of the Union Flag during a parade for Elizabeth II's official birthday

In July 2007, prime minister Gordon Brown unveiled plans to have the Union Flag flown more often from government buildings. While consultation on new guidelines was under way, the decision to fly the flag could be made by each government department. In March 2021, the UK government published new guidance for the Union Flag to be flown all year round on UK government buildings, unless another flag is being flown, such as another national flag of the UK, a county flag, or other flags to mark civic pride.

Previously, the flag was generally only flown on public buildings on days marking the birthdays of members of the royal family, the wedding anniversary of the monarch, Commonwealth Day, Accession Day, Coronation Day, the monarch's official birthday, Remembrance Sunday, and on the days of the State Opening and prorogation of Parliament. Non-government organisations were (and are) permitted to fly the Union Flag whenever they choose.

Current guidance from the UK Government, first published in February 2013 and last updated in January 2026, states that governmental buildings in the UK are encouraged to fly the Union Flag all year round. It also specifies specific days when the flag must be flown from these buildings.

As of March 2026, the specified set of days when the Union Flag must be flown from government buildings throughout the UK are:

- Second Monday in March (Commonwealth Day)
- 9 April (anniversary of the wedding of The King and The Queen)
- 6 May (anniversary of the coronation of The King and The Queen)
- Second Saturday in June (official birthday of The King)
- 21 June (birthday of The Prince of Wales)
- 17 July (birthday of The Queen)
- 8 September (anniversary of the accession of The King)
- Second Sunday in November (Remembrance Sunday)
- 14 November (actual birthday of The King)

In addition, the flag must be flown on government buildings in the following areas on these days:

- Wales, 1 March: Saint David's Day
- Northern Ireland, 17 March: Saint Patrick's Day
- England, 23 April: Saint George's Day
- Scotland, 30 November: Saint Andrew's Day
- Greater London: the opening and proroguing of Parliament

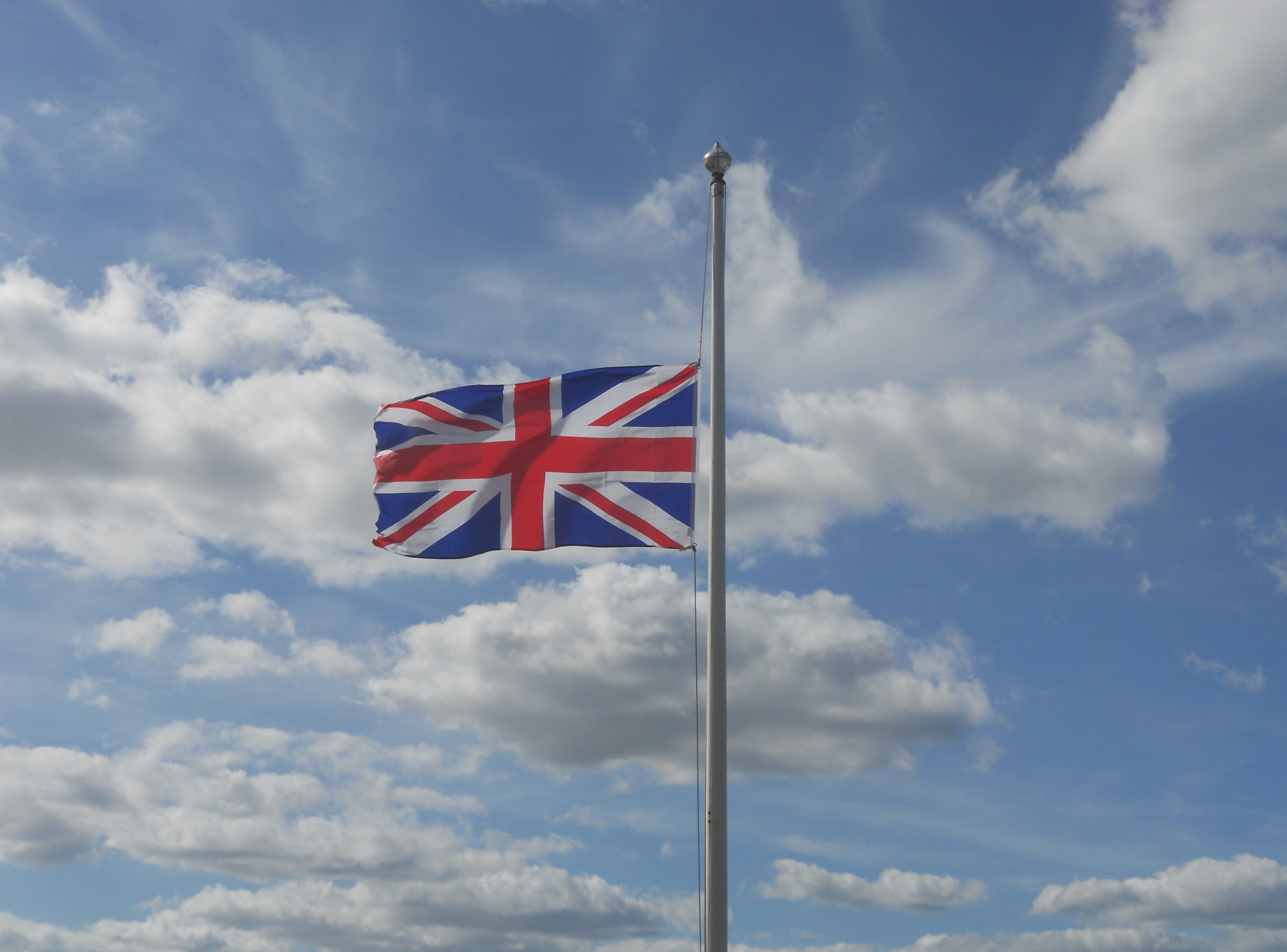
A Union Jack at half-mast after the death of Elizabeth II in September 2022

The Union Flag is flown at half-mast from the announcement of the death of the sovereign (save for Proclamation Day), or upon command of the sovereign.

On 30 November, St Andrew's Day, the Union Flag can be flown in Scotland only where a building has more than one flagpole—on this day the Saltire will not be lowered to make way for the Union Flag if there is only one flagpole. This difference arose after members of the Scottish Parliament complained that Scotland was the only country in the world that could not fly its national flag on its national day. However, on 23 April, St George's Day, it is the Union Flag of the United Kingdom that is flown over UK government offices in England.

=== Usage and disposal ===
The Union Flag has no official status in the United Kingdom, and there are no national regulations concerning its use or prohibitions against flag desecration. In Northern Ireland, the Flags Regulations (Northern Ireland) 2000 provide for the flying of the flag on government buildings on certain occasions, when it is flown half-mast, and how it is displayed with other flags.

The Flags and Heraldry Committee, an all-party parliamentary group lobbying for official standards, cooperated with the Flag Institute in 2010 to publish a set of recommended guidelines for the flag's display and use as a symbol.

There is no specific way in which the Union Flag should be folded. It is usually folded rectilinearly, with the hoist on the outside, to be easily reattached to the pole.

Royal Navy Stores Duties Instructions, article 447, dated 26 February 1914, specified that flags condemned from further service use were to be torn up into small pieces and disposed of as rags, not to be used for decoration or sold. The exception was flags that had flown in action: these could be framed and kept on board, or transferred to a "suitable place", such as a museum.

==== Position of Honour ====
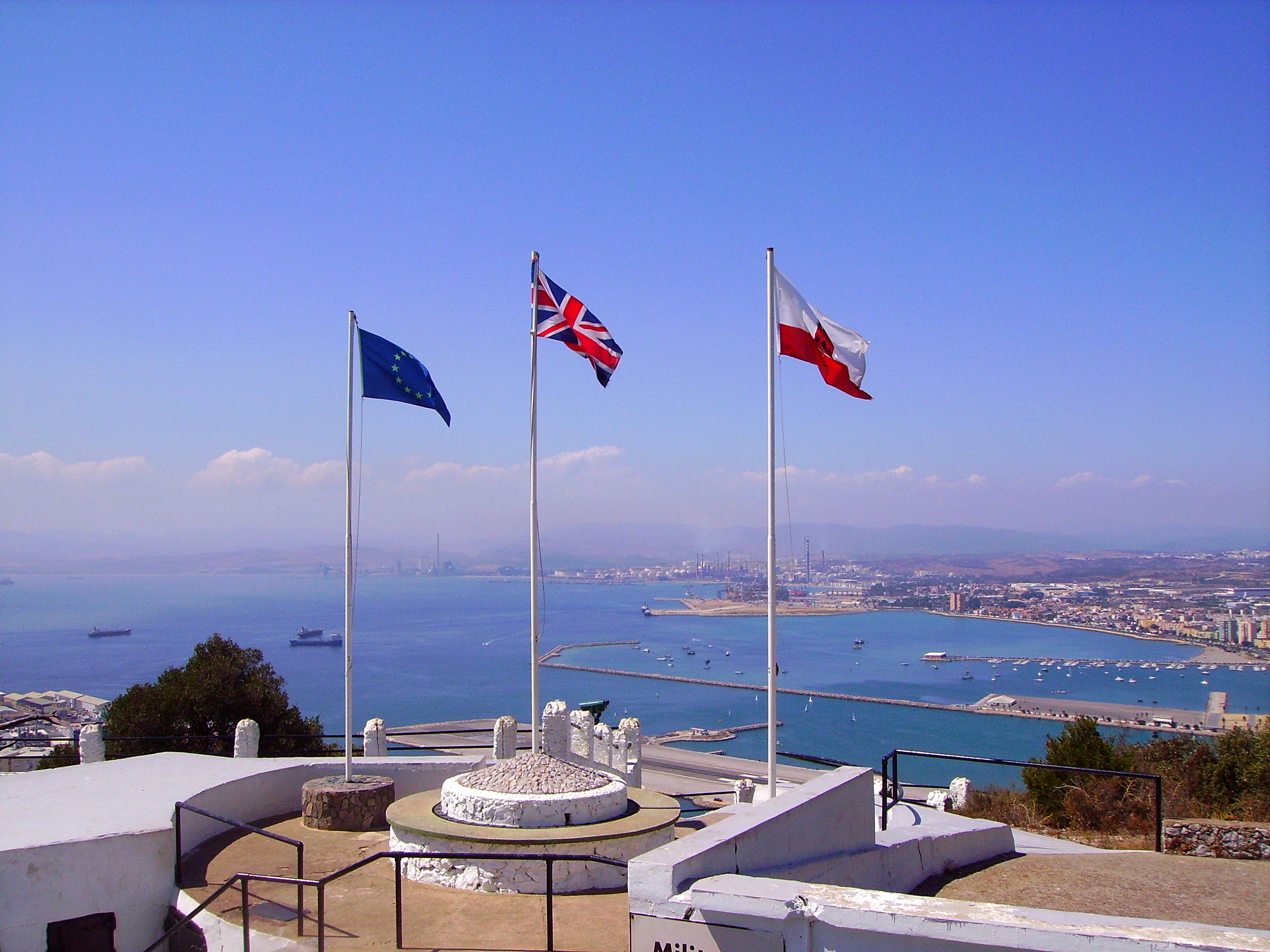
The Union Jack in a raised, central position, flanked by the Flag of Europe (left) and Flag of Gibraltar

According to the UK Flag Protocol, the order of precedence of flags in the United Kingdom is: the Royal Standards, the Union Flag, the flag of the host country (England, Scotland and Wales etc.), the flags of other nations (in English alphabetical order), the Commonwealth Flag, the county flags, the flags of cities or towns, the banners of arms, and the house flags.

==== British Overseas Territories and Crown Dependencies ====
The Union Jack is the national flag of the British Overseas Territories, which are parts of the British realm with varying degrees of local autonomy. Most populated administrative regions and territories of the United Kingdom have been granted a unique flag for the locality, usually the Blue Ensign or Red Ensign defaced with the distinguishing arms of the territory. All fly the Union Jack in some form, with the exception of Gibraltar (other than the government ensign).

The Crown Dependencies, unlike the British Overseas Territories, are legally not part of the United Kingdom, and the Union Jack is not an official flag there. Outside the UK, the Union Jack is usually part of a special ensign in which it is placed in the upper left hand corner of a blue field, with a signifying crest in the bottom right. When the Union Jack and the territorial flag are flown together, the national flag is always arranged to take precedence over the territorial flag.

== Status outside the United Kingdom ==
=== Australia ===
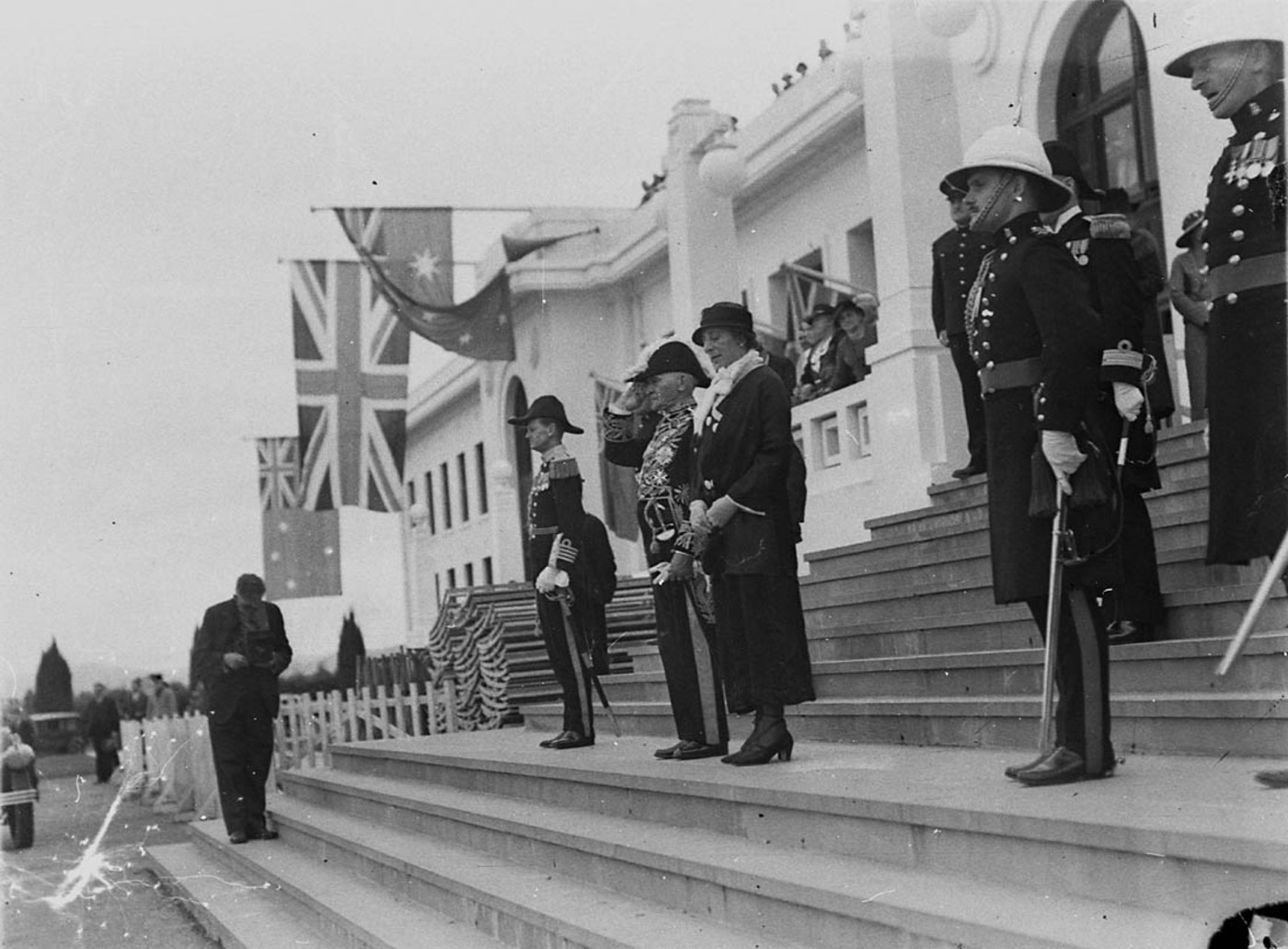
The Australian ensign and Union Jack hung vertically from Australia's Parliament House, 1931

The Union Flag was used formally as the Australian national flag until 1953, having official precedence over the Australian Blue Ensign, though the latter was used by government and informally. Schools were encouraged to fly the Union Jack to encourage patriotism for the British Empire, with South Australia requiring students from 1911 to 1956 to fly the Union Jack for the "national salute".

Over time, the blue ensign came to be used and embraced as the national flag, officially being designated as the Australian National Flag in 1953 with the passage of the Flags Act. Due to the sensitivity of those who still considered the Union Jack the national flag, the act specified that it did "not affect the right or privilege of a person to fly the Union Jack". Additionally, Australian prime minister Robert Menzies told Australians that the Union Flag would be flown together with the Australian national flag "on notable occasions". The Union Jack continued to see informal use as a flag of Australia for a period thereafter, although by the 1980s, the majority of Australians viewed the Australian blue ensign as the national flag as opposed to the Union Jack.

=== Canada ===
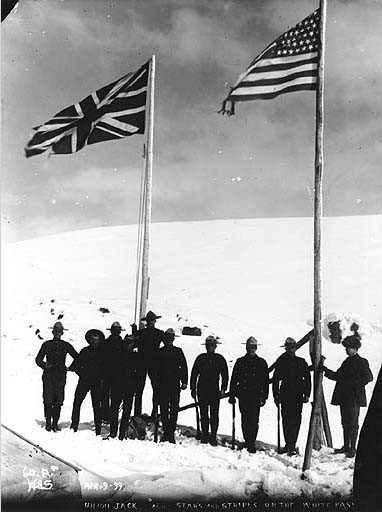
The Union Flag and the U.S. flag at the Canada-U.S. border, 1899. The Union Flag was the formal flag of Canada until 1965.

The Union Jack was the official national flag of Canada until 1965 when it was replaced in that role by the Maple Leaf flag. Since 1965, the Union Jack in Canada is used as an authorised symbol to represent Canada's "membership in the Commonwealth of Nations and its allegiance to the Crown".

==== History ====
The Union Jack has been used in a variety of colonies in British North America since its official adoption in 1707, In 1867, the British North American colonies of New Brunswick, Nova Scotia, and the Province of Canada were united to form the Canadian Confederation; with the Union Jack being retained as the official flag of the new "confederation".

In addition to the Union Jack, during the late 19th century, a red ensign defaced with the arms of Canada was also used as an informal flag of Canada. The defaced Red Ensign, later known as the Canadian Red Ensign, was eventually authorised for official use as the country's civil ensign in 1892. Although the Canadian Red Ensign was only formally authorised as a civil ensign, it was also viewed as a de facto national flag, as it was a uniquely Canadian symbol.

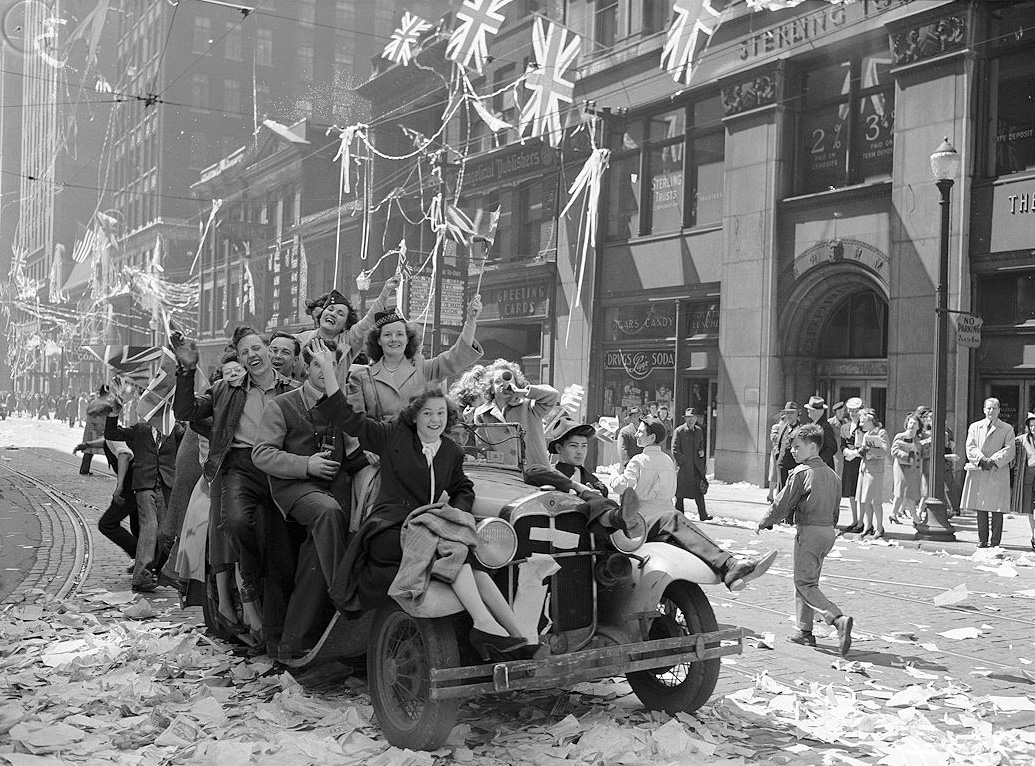
VE Day celebrations in Toronto in 1945, with several buildings flying the Union Jack and several people waving the flag

In 1964, Canadian Prime Minister Lester B. Pearson introduced plans to replace the Union Flag with a new national flag, spurring the Great Canadian flag debate. A new national flag, the Maple Leaf, was approved by the parliament of Canada on 18 December 1964. However, on the following day, the Canadian parliament passed another resolution that designated the Union Flag as the Royal Union Flag and authorised its official use as the symbol of the country's membership in the Commonwealth of Nations and its allegiance to the Crown. On 15 February 1965, the maple leaf flag formally replaced the Union Flag as the flag of Canada following an official proclamation by Elizabeth II, with the Royal Union Flag becoming an official ceremonial flag. The Royal Union Flag's specific use as approved by parliament was registered with the Canadian Heraldic Authority in May 2005.

The Union Flag was also legislated as the national flag for the Dominion of Newfoundland in 1931, a separate dominion of the British Empire. Newfoundland retained the Union Flag as a provincial flag after it joined the Canadian confederation in 1949, reaffirmed through the 1952 Revised Statutes of Newfoundland. In 1980, the flag of Newfoundland was adopted as the new provincial flag, with the design for the new flag of Newfoundland being derived from the Union Flag.

==== Protocol ====
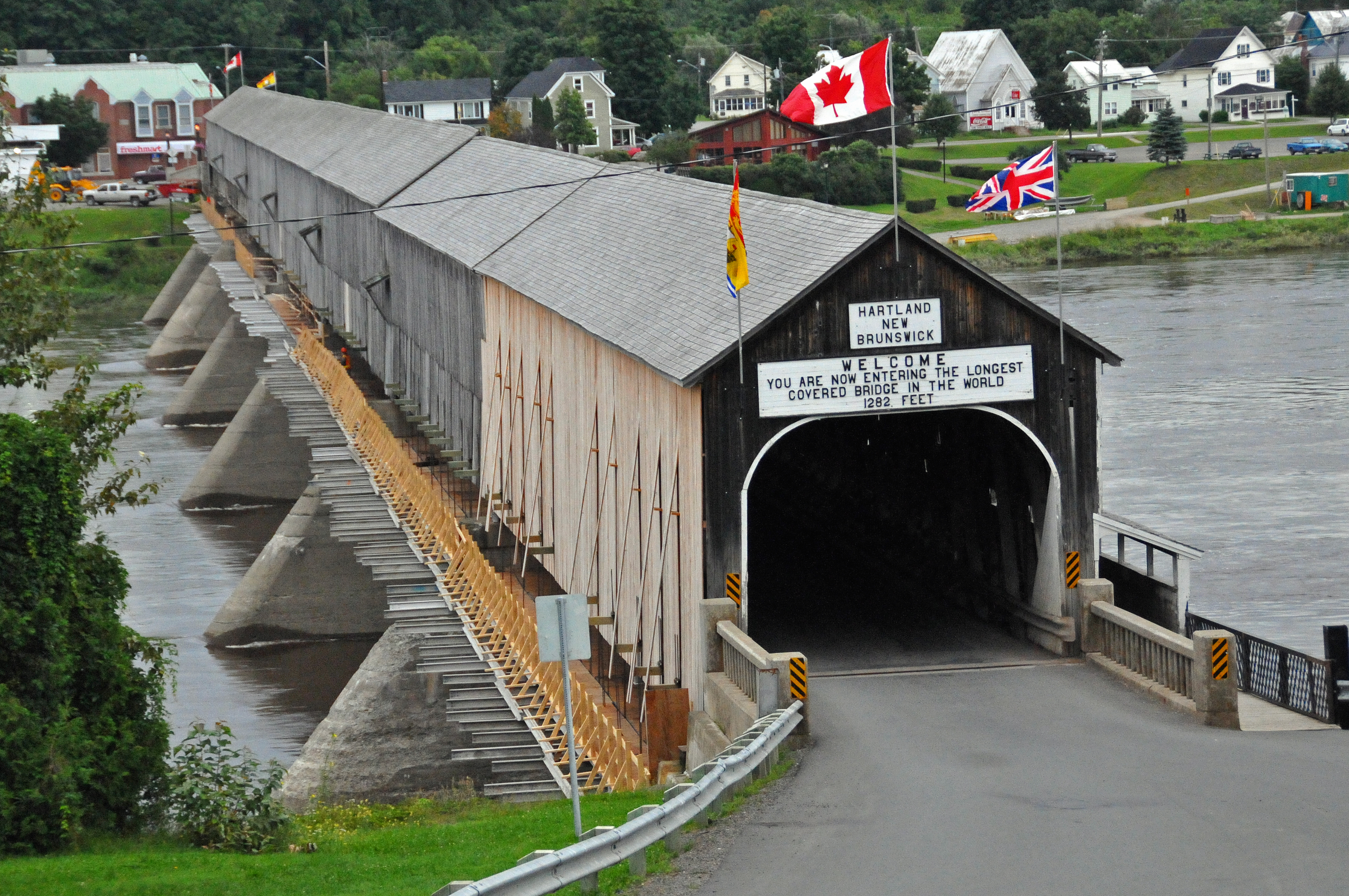
The flag of Canada in the position of honour, with the Royal Union Jack placed third, after the provincial flag of New Brunswick, per Canadian protocol

The parliamentary resolution passed on 18 December 1964 assigned two purposes to the Royal Union Flag, as the flag of the United Kingdom and as a Canadian flag symbolizing Canada's allegiance to the Crown and Commonwealth membership. When used to represent the United Kingdom, the flag takes precedence before the flag of a Canadian province or territory. However, when the flag is used as a ceremonial flag of Canada, the flag of a Canadian province or territory takes precedence before the Royal Union Flag.

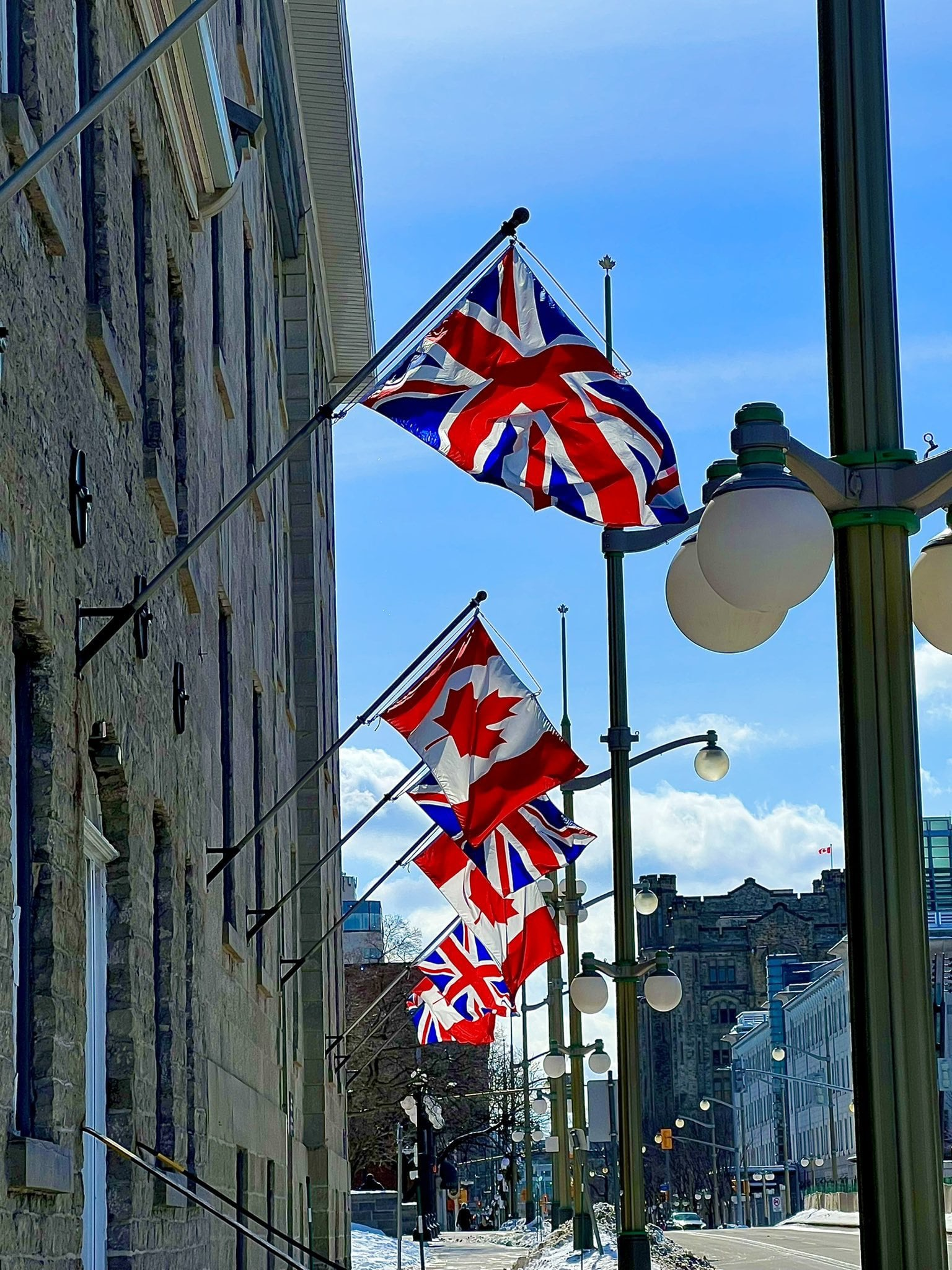
The Royal Union Flag flown during Commonwealth Day in 2022

The parliamentary resolution requires the Royal Union Flag to be flown alongside the national flag of Canada (if there are at least two flag poles available) on federal properties on Commonwealth Day, Victoria Day (the monarch's official birthday in Canada), 11 December (the anniversary of the enactment of the Statute of Westminster, 1931), and when otherwise instructed to do so by the National Defence Headquarters. The Royal Union Flag may also be formally flown alongside the flag of Canada at federal locations in Canada for ceremonies, anniversaries, and other events relating to the Canadian Armed Forces or other forces in the Commonwealth.

Items and properties that the parliamentary resolution applies to includes buildings operated by the federal government, military installations, federally-operated airports, at the masthead of Royal Canadian Navy ships within Canadian waters, and other appropriate establishments. The requirement for federal properties to fly the Royal Union Flag applies only when there are two or more flagpoles on the property, to ensure that the national flag of Canada is not taken down in place of the Royal Union Flag.

=== New Zealand ===
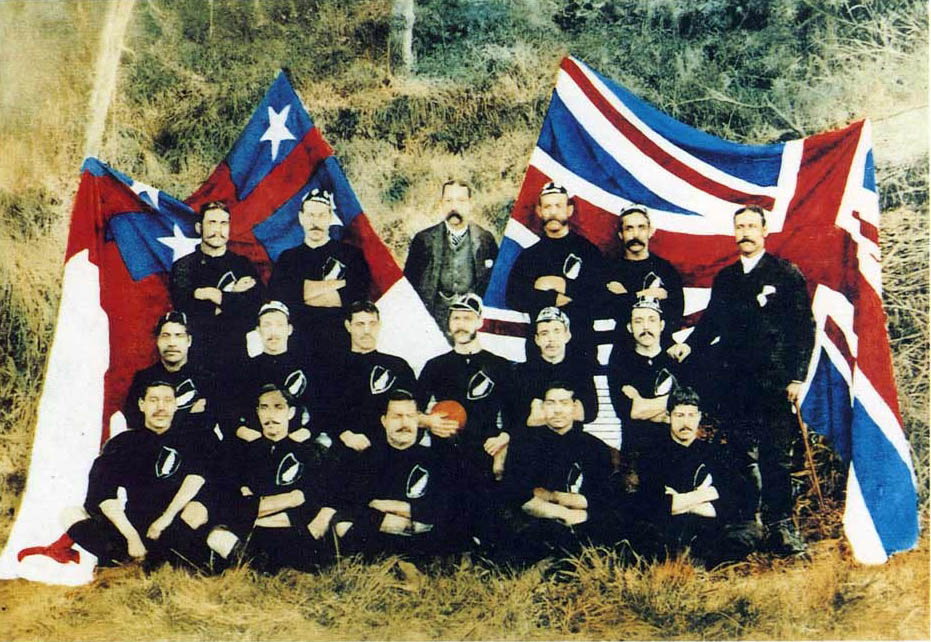
The 1888–89 New Zealand Native football team pose in front of the flag of the United Tribes of New Zealand and the Union Jack, 1889

The Union Flag became the flag of New Zealand after the Treaty of Waitangi was signed in February 1840, replacing the flag used by the United Tribes of New Zealand. The issue of flying the flag of the United Tribes alongside the Union Jack, as a symbol of their equal standing with the colonial government, was a factor that led to the Flagstaff War, led by Ngāpuhi chief Hōne Heke. British maritime flags were used by New Zealand vessels until 1865. After the passage of the Colonial Naval Defence Act 1865, vessels of the New Zealand government used a defaced Blue Ensign issued by the colonial government.

The current national flag of New Zealand was given official standing under the New Zealand Ensign Act in 1902, replacing the Union Flag. However, the Union Flag continued to see tandem use with the national flag of New Zealand into the 1950s.

=== South Africa ===
The Union Jack was used as the flag of a variety of colonies in South Africa since 1795. The Union Jack was retained as the official flag of the Union of South Africa after its formation in 1910. In addition to the Union Jack, from 1910 to 1928, the South African Red Ensign was also treated as an unofficial flag of the union.

Proposals to adopt a national flag were made during the 1920s. In 1927, the Union Nationality and Flag Act was passed by the Parliament of South Africa, which named both the Union Jack and the Oranje, Blanje, Blou flag of South Africa as the flags of the union, both co-equal in status. The Oranje, Blanje, Blou flag also incorporated the Union Jack in its design, alongside the flag of the Orange Free State and the flag of the South African Republic. The Union Jack was to be flown alongside the Oranje, Blanje, Blou at principal government buildings in the capitals, at Union ports, on government offices abroad, and at such other places as the government might determine. The act went into effect on 31 May 1928.

Instructions issued in 1931 confirmed the places where both flags were to be flown. In addition to those already mentioned, they were the Union Buildings in Pretoria, the head offices of the four provincial administrations, the supreme courts, certain magistrates' courts, customs houses, and three buildings in Durban (the general post office, the railway station, and the local military district headquarters). Under these arrangements, the Union Jack was subordinate to the Oranje, Blanje, Blou. As the two flags had to be the same size, it meant that the Union Jack was made in the ratio 2:3 rather than the usual 1:2.

This dual arrangement continued until 1957, when the Flags Amendment Act was passed naming the Oranje, Blanje, Blou as the sole flag of South Africa. The Oranje, Blanje, Blou was replaced by the flag of South Africa in 1994 as the country's national flag.

=== Use outside the Commonwealth ===
Movements in countries not a part of the Commonwealth of Nations have adopted the Union Flag as a flag of protest.

==== Hong Kong ====
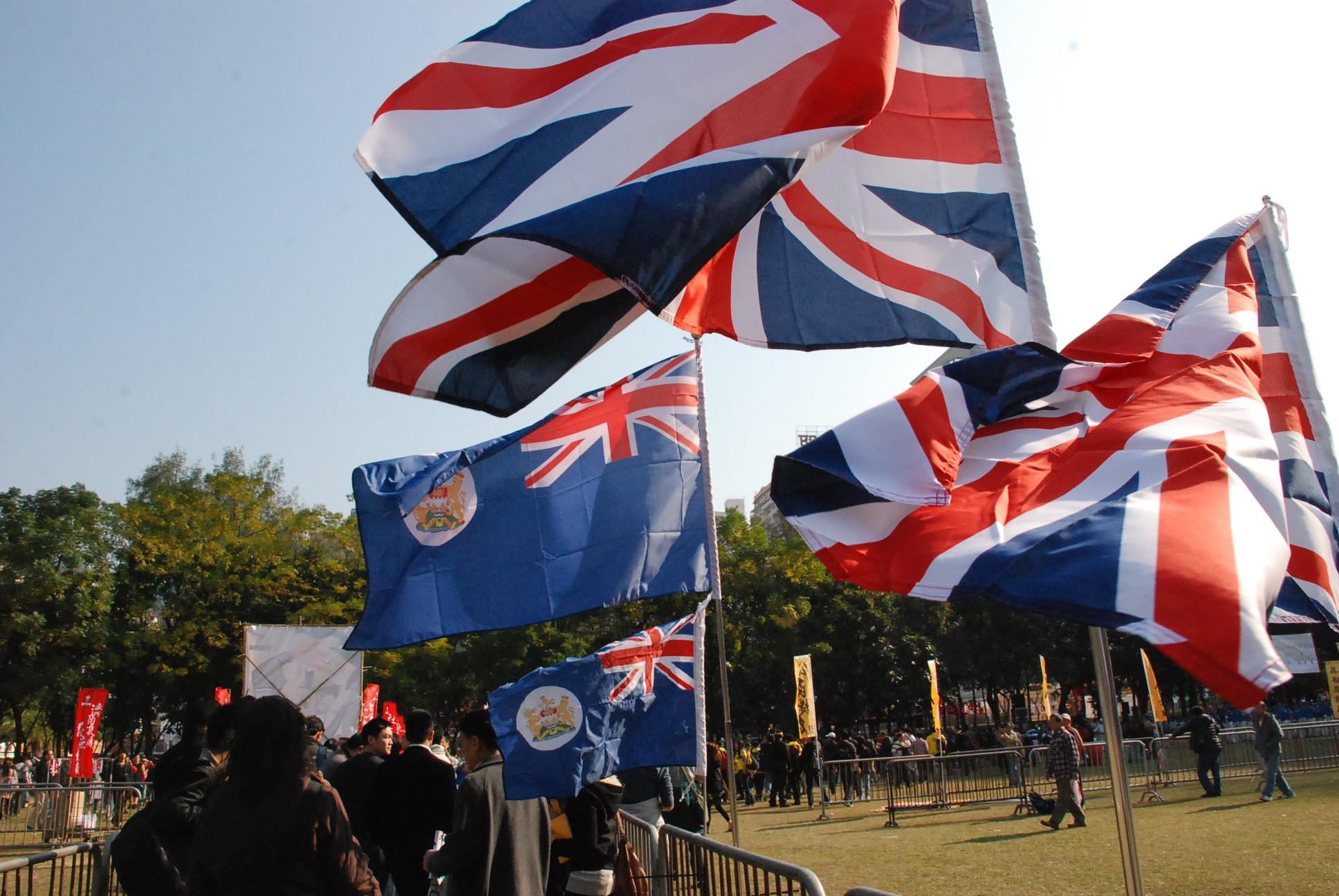
The Union Jack alongside the colonial Hong Kong flag, during the 2014 new year march in Hong Kong

The Union Flag was formerly used in Hong Kong when it was a British Dependent Territory. Official use of the Union Flag and the British colonial Hong Kong flag ceased following the handover of Hong Kong to China in July 1997. In the 2010s, the Union Flag, along with the colonial flag of Hong Kong began to see use by supporters of the pro-democracy camp during the 2014 Hong Kong protests, and the 2019–20 Hong Kong protests. The flag has been displayed at other pro-democracy events in Hong Kong, including the new year marches and the 1 July marches. Members of the Hong Kong Autonomy Movement, the Hong Kong independence movement and Hong Kong localists have been seen wielding the Union Flag or the colonial flag of Hong Kong.

However, the meaning behind the use of the flags by pro-democracy protestors, including the Union Flag, remains disputed with protestors citing a variety of reasons for flying it. Some pro-democracy protestors that flew foreign flags, including the Union Flag, did so in an effort to attract international media attention to the protests, while others did so in an effort to irritate the central government of China. The Union Flag, in addition to other foreign flags, were also used by some protestors to illustrate their desire for Hong Kong to be an "international city"; whereas others used the flag simply as a generic symbol of freedom.

Some specifically flew the Union Flag and the colonial flag of Hong Kong, nostalgic of the "values" of the previous colonial government, namely "personal freedoms, rule of law, [and] clean governance". Other pro-democracy protestors choose to use the Union Flag and the colonial flag of Hong Kong in an effort to call upon the British government to declare that China had failed to uphold the Sino-British Joint Declaration. Several Hongkongers that hold British National (Overseas) passports who used the flag during the protests were doing so as a call to the British government to grant British National (Overseas) the right to abode in the United Kingdom. Although a small number of Hongkongers seek direct British intervention into the matter, the majority of those that used the Union Flag or the colonial flag of Hong Kong during the protests do not hold such beliefs.

The use of foreign flags at the protests, including the Union Flag, has been cited multiple times by the central government of China as evidence for their claim that foreign interference is steering the protests in Hong Kong against the central government. Conversely, several protestors in the pro-democracy camp have also criticised the use of foreign flags, who view their use as reinforcing the claims made by the central government of China.

==== Italy ====
After the British referendum on membership of the European Union resulted in a vote to leave, the Union Flag became a symbol of euroscepticism in Italy. In August 2016, many local businesses along the Italian riviera hoisted the flags as a protest against the implementation of the Services in the Internal Market Directive 2006.

== Use in other flags ==
=== National and regional flags ===
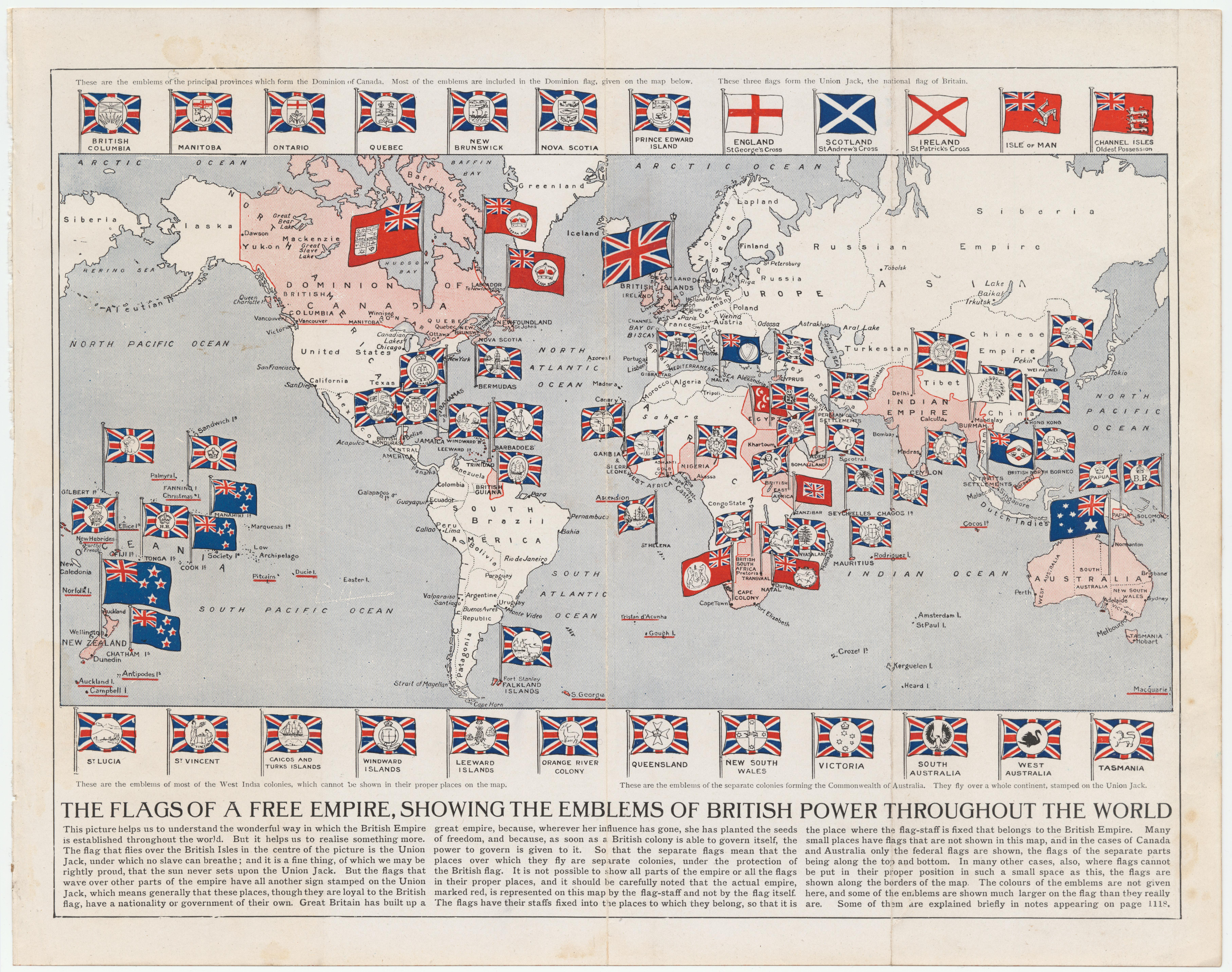
Map of the British Empire from 1910, with the ensigns and emblems of several British dominions and colonies displayed

As the national flag of the entire British Realm, the Union Flag was found in the canton (upper flagpole-side quarter) of the flags of many colonies of Britain, while the field (background) of their flags was the colour of the naval ensign flown by the particular Royal Navy squadron that patrolled that region of the world. Nations and colonies that have used the Union Flag at some stage have included Aden, Basutoland (now Lesotho), Barbados, Bechuanaland (now Botswana), Borneo, Burma, Canada, Ceylon (now Sri Lanka), Cyprus, Dominica, British East Africa (Kenya Colony), Gambia, Gold Coast (Ghana), Grenada, Guiana, Hong Kong, Jamaica, Labuan (Malaysia), Lagos, Malta, Mauritius, Nigeria, Palestine, Penang (Malaysia), Rhodesia (now Zimbabwe), Sierra Leone, Singapore, Somaliland, South Africa, Anglo-Egyptian Sudan, Pre-partitioned India (present-day India, Pakistan, Bangladesh, and Myanmar), Tanganyika, Trinidad and Tobago, Uganda, the United States, and Weihaiwei. As former British Empire nations were granted independence, these and other versions of the Union Flag were decommissioned. The most recent decommissioning of the Union Flag came on 1 July 1997, when the former Dependent Territory of Hong Kong was handed over to the People's Republic of China.

Four former British colonies in Oceania which are now independent countries incorporate the Union Jack as part of their national flags: Australia, New Zealand and Tuvalu, which have retained the monarchy; and Fiji, which abolished the monarchy in 1987.

In 2015, Fijian Prime Minister Frank Bainimarama announced that the country would remove the Union Jack from its national flag, calling the symbol "out of date" and "no longer relevant". However, these plans were abandoned the next year, with Bainimarama citing the potential cost and the prominence of the flag in celebrations after winning gold in the men's rugby sevens at the Rio Olympics.

In 2016, New Zealand held a referendum on whether the country should retain its existing flag (with the Union Jack) or adopt a design featuring the silver fern. 56.6% of voters opted to maintain the status quo.

Flag of Australia

Flag of Fiji

Flag of New Zealand

Flag of Tuvalu

National flags of sovereign states whose design incorporates a Union Jack in their canton

In former British colonies, the Union Jack was used interchangeably with informal flags of the territory for significant parts of their colonial early history. The Union Flag was used as the flag of Canada until it was re-adopted as a ceremonial flag, and the Maple Leaf flag made the official national flag in 1965. In addition to being an official ceremonial flag, the Union Flag also defaces the flags of a number of Canadian provinces, including British Columbia, Manitoba, and Ontario. Newfoundland and Labrador uses a flag that was derived from the Union Flag, with the Union Jack serving as the flag of Newfoundland until 1980. The Union Flag, and flags defaced with the Union Flag in its canton, similar to the Canadian Red Ensign, continue to see use in Canada in a private capacity. The pre-1801 Union Flag also sees limited use by private organisations, most notably the United Empire Loyalists Association of Canada.

Along with the national flag, many other Australian flags retain the use of the Union Jack, including the Royal Australian Navy Ensign (also known as the Australian White Ensign), the Royal Australian Air Force Ensign, the Australian Red Ensign (for use by merchant and private vessels), and the Australian Civil Aviation Ensign. The flags of all six Australian states retain the Union Jack in the canton, as do some regional flags such as the Upper and Lower Murray River Flags. The vice-regal flags of the state governors also use the Union Jack. While the Flags Act 1953 states that Australians still have the "right or privilege" to fly the Union Jack after the introduction of the Australian national flag, usage of the Union Jack by itself is unusual. The unofficial flag of Lord Howe Island harks to the pre-1801 Union Jack.

The Basque Country's flag, the Ikurriña, is also loosely based on the Union Jack, reflecting the significant commercial ties between Bilbao and Britain at the time the Ikurriña was designed in 1894. The Miskito people sometimes use a similar flag that also incorporates the Union Jack in its canton, due to long periods of contact in the Mosquito Coast.

Flag of the United States
(1776–1777)

Flag of the Kingdom of Hawaii
(1816–1845)

Flag of the Tamatave Kingdom
(1826–1828)

Flag of South Africa (1928–1994)

Former national flags that incorporated the Union Jack in their design

The Union Jack was used by the United States in its first flag, the Continental Union Flag. This flag was of a similar design to the one used by the British East India Company. The historical Kingdom of Hawaii adopted a flag featuring a Union Jack which was retained when Hawaii became a US state in 1959. Hawaii's flag represents the only current use of the Union Jack in any American state flag.

Also in the United States, the Union Flag of 1606 is incorporated into the flag of Baton Rouge, the capital city of Louisiana. Baton Rouge was a British colony from the time of the Seven Years' War until the end of the American Revolutionary War, when it was captured by Spanish forces. Symbols from the colonial powers France and Spain are also incorporated into the Baton Rouge flag. Taunton, Massachusetts, uses a defaced Red Ensign variant featuring the old-style Union Jack and has since 1974, as does Weymouth Township, New Jersey. Westmoreland County, Pennsylvania, has been known to fly a flag containing the King's Colours since 1973.

The Union Jack also appeared on both the 1910–1928 and 1928–1994 flags of South Africa. The 1910–1928 flag was a Red Ensign with the Union coat of arms in the fly. The 1928–1994 flag, based on the Prinsenvlag and commonly known as the oranje-blanje-blou (orange-white-blue), contained the Union Jack as part of a central motif at par with the flags of the two Boer republics of the Orange Free State and Transvaal. To keep any one of the three flags from having precedence, the Union Jack is spread horizontally from the Orange Free State flag towards the hoist; closest to the hoist, it is in the superior position but since it is reversed it does not precede the other flags. The present flag of South Africa features a nod to the Union Jack in its red, white and blue portion, the colours also harking to the South African Republic and the Dutch tricolour.

The flag of the Municipal Council of Shanghai International Settlement in 1869 contained multiple flags to symbolise the countries have participated in the creation and management of this enclave in the Chinese city of Shanghai. The Union Jack was contained as part of top left hand shield and close to the flags of the United States and France, there was also contained the flag of Prussia nearby, but it was removed around 1917.

The flag of the Chilean city of Coquimbo features the Union Jack, owing to its historical commercial links to Britain.

Selected British colonial and overseas territorial flags that incorporate the Union Jack
The flag of Bermuda, a British Overseas Territory

The flag of the British Indian Ocean Territory, a British Overseas Territory

The flag of British Virgin Islands, a British Overseas Territory

The flag of the Cayman Islands, a British Overseas Territory

The flag of the Cook Islands, an Overseas territory of New Zealand.

The flag of the Falkland Islands, a British Overseas Territory

The flag of British Burma (1939–1948)

The flag of British Cyprus (1922–1960)

The flag of British Heligoland (1807–1890)

The flag of India (1885–1947)

The flag of Ceylon (1875–1948)

The flag of the Cook Islands Federation (1893–1901)

The flag of Hong Kong (1959–1997)

The flag of Malta (1943–1964)

The flag of Rhodesia (1964–1968)

The flag of Singapore (1952–1959)

The flag of British Trinidad and Tobago (1958–1962)

The flag of the United States of the Ionian Islands (1815–1864)

The flag of Weihaiwei (1903–1930)
Selected regional and community flags that incorporate the Union Jack
The flag of Baton Rouge, Louisiana

The flag of British Columbia, a Canadian province

The flag of Coquimbo, Chile

The flag of Hawaii, a U.S. state

The flag of Manitoba, a Canadian province

Combined Murray River Flag (Combined)

Murray River Flag (Lower)

Murray River Flag (Upper)

The flag of Newfoundland and Labrador, a Canadian province

The flag of Niue, an autonomous island associated with New Zealand

The flag of Ontario, a Canadian province

The flag of Queensland, an Australian state

The flag of Taunton, Massachusetts

The Flag of Victoria, an Australian state

=== Ensigns ===
The Union Flag can be found in the canton of several of the ensigns flown by vessels and aircraft of the United Kingdom and its overseas territories, and on land at locations associated with the organisation which the ensign represents, for example government offices, military establishments, etc. These are used in cases where it is illegal or inappropriate to fly the Union Flag, such as at sea from a ship other than a British warship. Normal practice for British ships is to fly the White Ensign (Royal Navy), the Red Ensign (Merchant and private boats) or the Blue Ensign (government departments and public corporations). Similar ensigns are used by other countries (such as New Zealand and Australia) with the Union Flag in the canton. Other Commonwealth countries (such as India and Jamaica) may follow similar ensign etiquette as the UK, replacing the Union Flag with their own national flag.

Royal Navy White Ensign

Merchant Navy Red Ensign

Royal Air Force Ensign

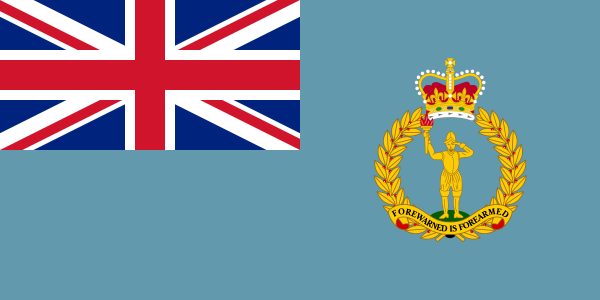
Royal Observer Corps Ensign (1953-1995)

Air Training Corps Ensign

British Civil Air Ensign

Blue Ensign

HM Coastguard Ensign

Ensign of the Northern Lighthouse Board (NLB)

White Ensign of NLB Commissioners (Note
pre-1801 Union flag)

Blue Ensign of Bermuda flown by vessels of the Department of Marine and Ports and Police

Isle of Man Red Ensign

Gibraltar State Ensign

Civil Ensign of Jersey

Government of Jersey Ensign

Civil Ensign of Guernsey

Government of Guernsey Ensign

Cayman Islands Red Ensign

Royal Australian Navy Ensign

Royal Australian Air Force Ensign

Australian Civil Ensign

Australian Civil Aviation Ensign

Canadian Civil Ensign (1957–1965)

Canadian Naval Jack (1957–1965)

Royal Canadian Air Force Ensign (1940–1965)

Canadian Air Board Ensign (1922–1923)

Canadian Army Battle flag (1939–1944)

Royal Canadian Sea Cadets Ensign (1953–1976)

Navy League of Canada Ensign (1929–1965)

Dominion of Newfoundland Civil Ensign (1907–1931)

New Zealand Civil Air Ensign

Royal New Zealand Air Force Ensign

Royal New Zealand Navy Ensign

New Zealand Civil Ensign

Fijian Naval Ensign

Fijian Civil Ensign

Fijian Civil Air Ensign

Australian Civil Aviation Ensign (1935–1948)

Unofficial Van Diemen's Land Ensign

Royal Australian Air Force Ensign (1948–1982)

Victorian Red Ensign (1870–1877)

Royal Indian Navy Ensign

Indian Army Ensign

Blue Ensign of the British Antarctic Territory

Government Service Ensign

Scottish Government's Marine Directorate Ensign

Ensign of the Sea Cadet Corps

Ensign of the Royal Bermuda Yacht Club

=== Others ===
A Pilot Jack, a flag design that has a Union Jack at its centre, with a white border around it

The flag in a white border occasionally seen on merchant ships was sometimes referred to as the Pilot Jack. It can be traced back to 1823 when it was created as a signal flag, but not intended as a civil jack. A book issued to British consuls in 1855 states that the white bordered Union Flag is to be hoisted for a pilot. Although there was some ambiguity regarding the legality of it being flown for any other purpose on civilian vessels, its use as an ensign or jack was established well in advance of the 1864 Act that designated the Red Ensign for merchant shipping.

In 1970, the white-bordered Union Flag ceased to be the signal for a pilot, but references to it as national colours were not removed from the current Merchant Shipping Act and it was legally interpreted as a flag that could be flown on a merchant ship, as a jack if desired. This status was confirmed to an extent by the Merchant Shipping (Registration, etc.) Act 1993 and the consolidating Merchant Shipping Act 1995 which, in Section 4, Subsection 1, prohibits the use of any distinctive national colours or those used or resembling flags or pendants on Her Majesty's Ships, "except the Red Ensign, the Union flag (commonly known as the Union Jack) with a white border", and some other exceptions permitted elsewhere in the Acts. However, Section 2 regards the "British flag", and states that "The flag which every British ship is entitled to fly is the Red Ensign (without any defacement or modification) and, subject to (a warrant from Her Majesty or from the Secretary of State, or an Order of Council from her Majesty regarding a defaced Red Ensign), no other colours." The Flag Institute listed the white bordered Union Flag as "Civil Jack".

Naval Jack of Royal Indian Marine (1884-1928), a flag design that has a Union Jack at its centre, with a blue border around it

From 1884 until 1928, the Royal Indian Marine flew a modified Union Jack bordered with blue as its jack. From 11 November 1928 until its dissolution in 1947, it substituted the Blue Ensign defaced with the Star of India emblem as jack and flew the British White Ensign as ensign.

An unofficial flag for the British Empire was created around 1910 due to a belief that the Union Jack itself no longer sufficiently represented dominions such as Canada, which were beginning to adopt their own unique symbols. The flag was similar in design to a White Ensign, which features the Union Jack in the canton. In the other quadrants were the coats of arms of Canada, Australia, and South Africa. The four stars forming the Crux over Saint George's Cross represented New Zealand, and the Star of India was featured prominently in the middle. Civilians often flew Empire flags for patriotic events such as coronations, Empire Day, and the British Empire Exhibition. It is still flown on special occasions at the Dangarsleigh War Memorial.

The Hudson's Bay Company (HBC) and East India Company were two of only a few non-government institutions using the Union Jack in part of their flags. HBC rival North West Company had a similar flag to that of the HBC. The HBC Red Ensign was in use from 1801 to 1965 and was replaced with a corporate flag featuring the company's coat of arms. The East India Company, founded in 1600 and dissolved in 1874, used a red and white striped flag featuring, firstly, the flag of England, then flag of Great Britain and ultimately the flag of the United Kingdom in the canton.

The Union Jack is the third quarter of the 1939 coat of arms of Alabama, which is used on the flag of the governor of Alabama, representing British sovereignty over the state prior to 1783. The version used is the modern flag, whereas the 1707 flag would have been used in colonial Alabama.

A pink Union Jack, with the blue triangles of the Union Jack changed to pink in reference to the pink triangle symbol, was created by a gay man, David Gwinnutt, to express his "pride in being gay and British."

In the former International Settlement of Kulangsu the Kulangsu Municipal Police had a badge contained multiple flags, including the Union Flag. The badge was incorporated into their police flag.

Former Hudson's Bay Company flag

1801-1874 version of the East India Company flag

The unofficial British Empire flag incorporated dominion symbols

A pink Union Jack

== In popular culture ==
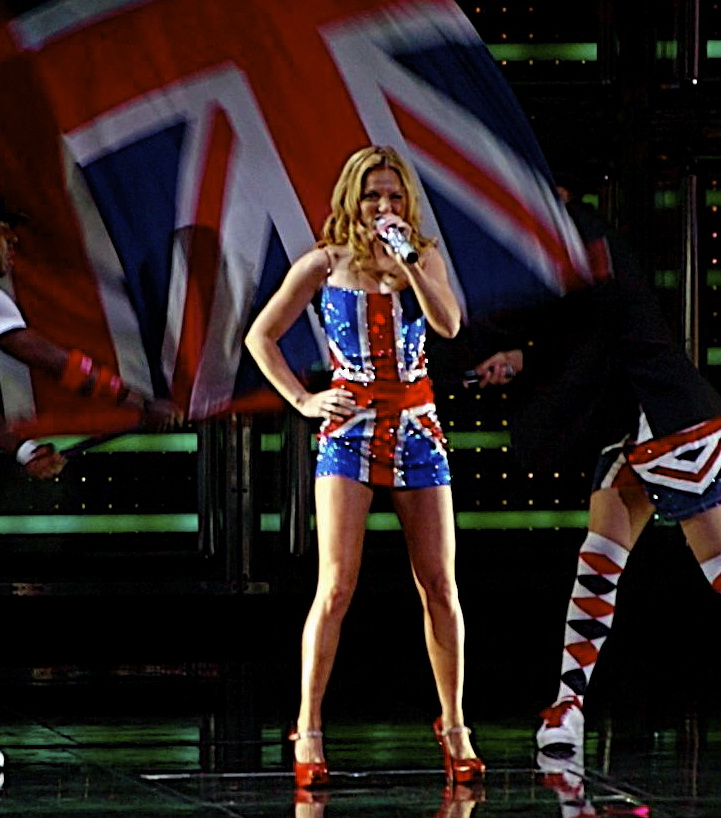
Geri Halliwell of the Spice Girls wearing a remake of the Union Jack dress she wore at the 1997 Brit Awards

The Union Jack represents a prominent symbol of British culture and soft power, with variations of its design being used in fashion and pop culture associated with the British Invasion movement of the 1960s and Cool Britannia era in the mid-1990s.

Many music artists have featured the Union Jack in their branding, including the Rolling Stones, the Who, the Kinks, the Jam, the Stone Roses, David Bowie, John Lennon, Paul McCartney, Freddie Mercury, Morrissey, Oasis, Blur, Iron Maiden, Def Leppard, and the Spice Girls. The flag notably featured on Noel Gallagher's Epiphone Sheraton II and Geri Halliwell's dress at the 1997 Brit Awards.

The Sex Pistols used the Union Jack in promotional material for their music. Jamie Reid designed the cover for their first single, Anarchy in the U.K., which featured a tattered Union Jack held together with safety pins. Reid also designed a print to promote God Save the Queen, which consisted of a black-and-white portrait of Elizabeth II over the Union Jack. The original design included swastikas covering her eyes and a safety pin through her mouth, although the final record cover instead showed her eyes and mouth torn away and covered with the band's name.

In international sporting competitions, the UK often uses the red, white and blue colour scheme. Team GB competes at the Olympics using a lion with a mane formed from the Union Jack in its logo. For the 2008 Olympics in Beijing, Team GB adopted Pride the Lion, a white lion with a red and blue mane, as its official mascot. This design was inspired by the 1966 English football team mascot, World Cup Willie (created by illustrator Reg Hoye), an anthropomorphic lion wearing a Union Jack football shirt.

A notable increase in popularity was seen in Cuba following the 2012 London Olympics, with clothing, nail decoration, tattoos, and hairstyles in youths being observed featuring the pattern. The flag became a common symbol in the underground UK rap scene in the 2020s.

The fictional Union Flag design as appears in Watch Dogs: Legion

A hypothetical Union Flag design appears in the Ubisoft-published action adventure game Watch Dogs: Legion, where following Scottish independence from the United Kingdom, the colour of the Union Flag is altered to reflect the absence of the Azure (blue) field of the flag of Scotland, which is replaced by the Sable (black) field of the Flag of Saint David, patron saint of Wales. The Or (gold) cross of Saint David forms a fimbriated border to the Gules (red) cross of Saint George.

=== Use in corporate branding ===
Commonly the Union Flag is used on computer software and Internet pages as an icon representing a choice of the English language where a choice amongst multiple languages may be presented to the user, though the American flag is also sometimes used for this purpose. The flag has been embroidered on various Reebok equipment as a mark of the brand's British origin, and the Reebok Union Jack has been referred to as a brand icon.

British Airways painted a cropped Union Flag on their tail fins until 1984; from 1997 on, they started painting a stylised, fluttering Union Flag on tail fins, nicknamed Chatham Dockyard Union Flag. The coat of arms of British Airways also features the escutcheon cropped from the Union Flag. British Airways used the coat of arms on their aircraft via the Landor livery between 1984 and 1997 and added back in 2011; they also used it as cap badge for pilots or in advertisements.

The BMW Mini tail lights are shaped after the Union Jack.

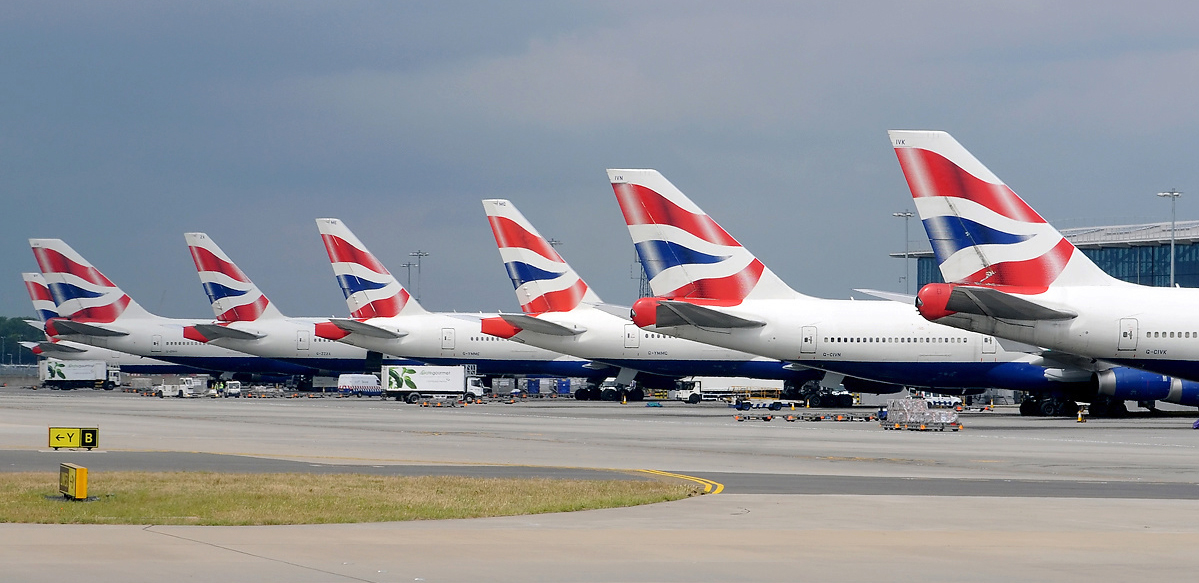
British Airways aircraft bearing Chatham Dockyard Union Flag tail art

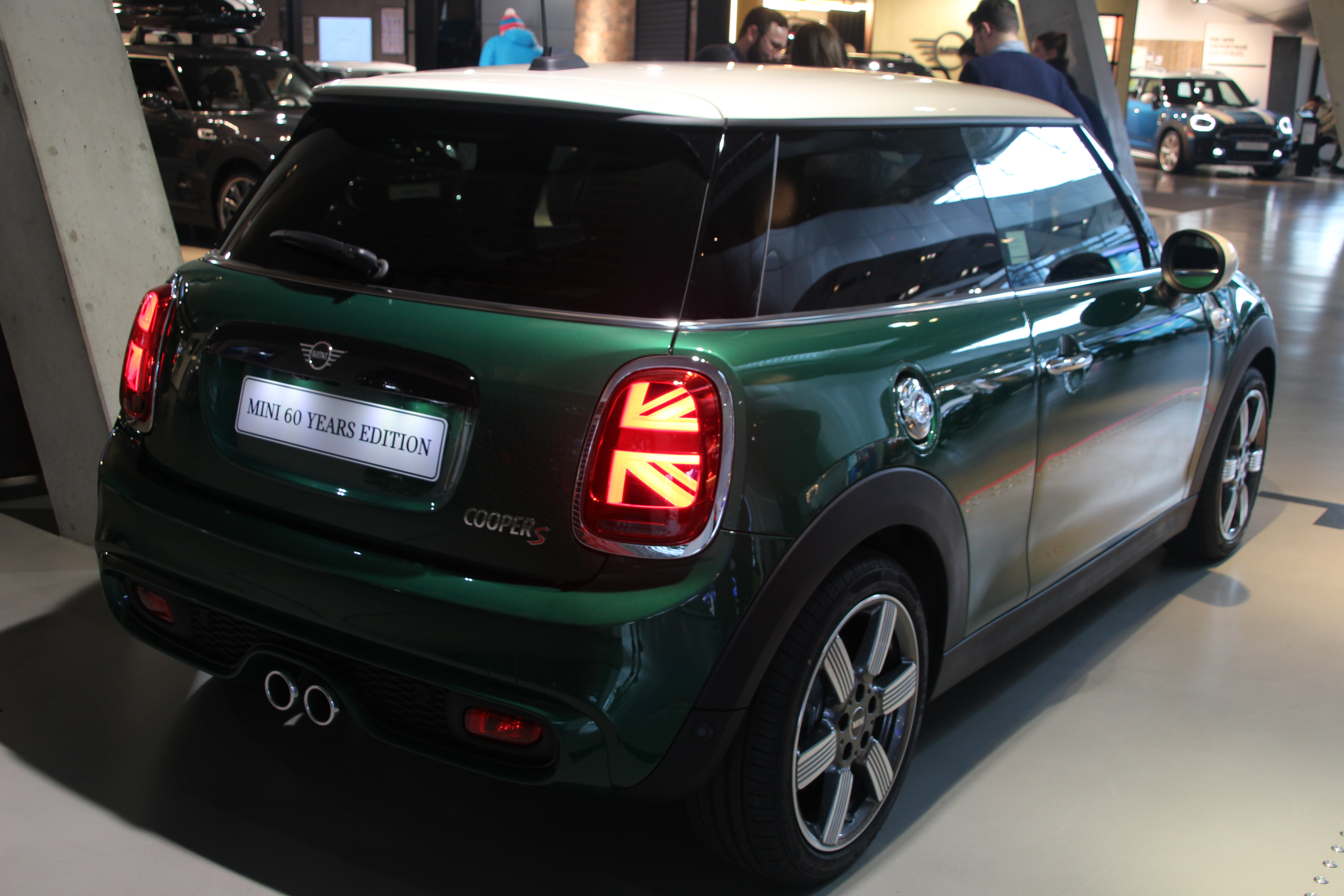
Rear of a Mini Hatch, with "Union Jack" tail lights

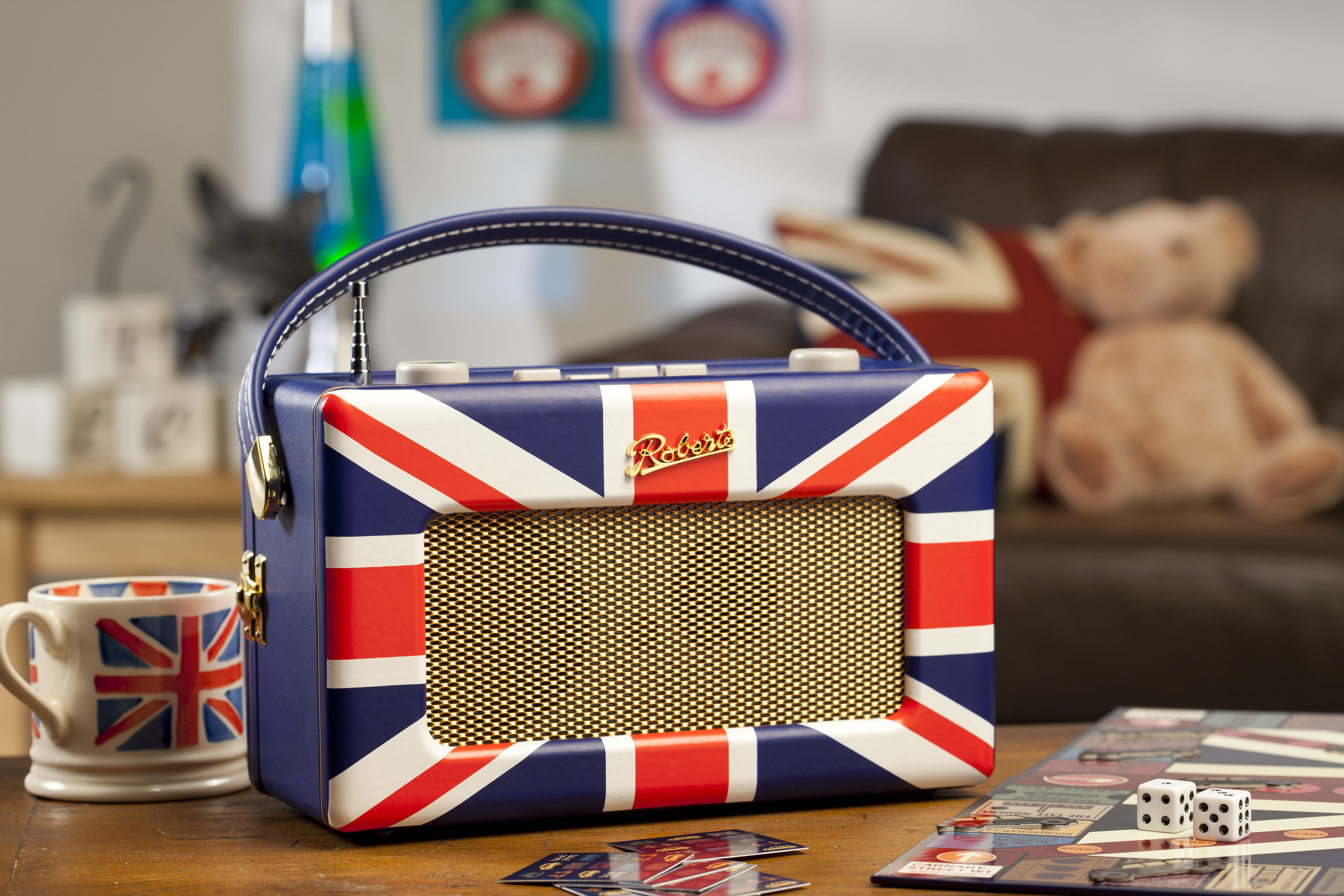
A Roberts Revival radio with a Union Jack livery

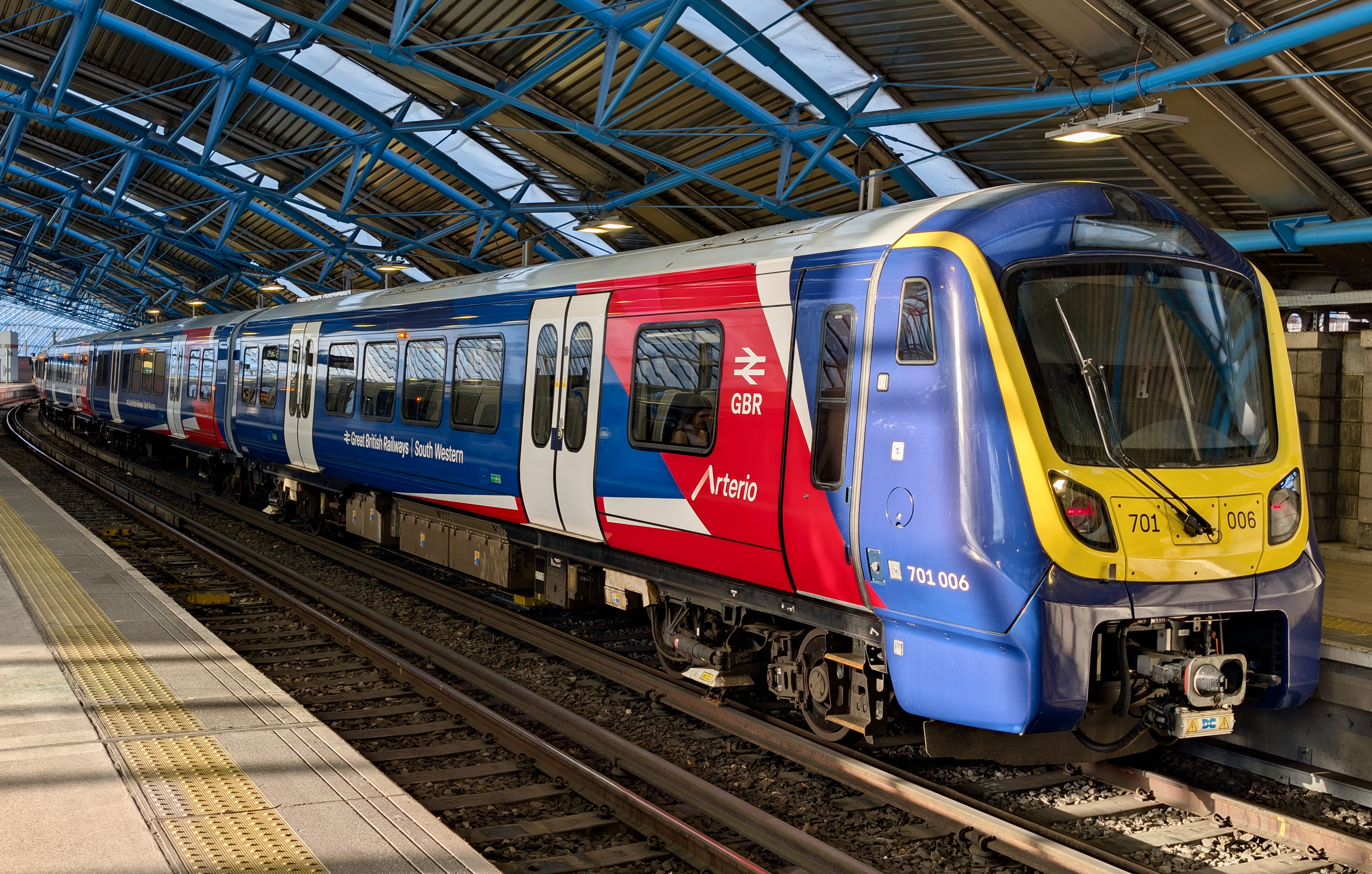
Class 701 in the Great British Railways livery

== See also ==
- List of United Kingdom flags
  - List of English flags
    - List of Cornish flags
  - List of Northern Irish flags
  - List of Scottish flags
  - List of Welsh flags
- List of flags of Ireland
- Northern Ireland flags issue
- National colours of the United Kingdom
- Flags of the English Interregnum
- Star of India (flag)
- Union Jack Club
- Union mark of Sweden and Norway
