= Van Diemen's Land Ensign =

Flag Ratio: 1:2 Van Diemen's Land Unofficial Ensign.

The Van Diemen's Land Ensign is an unofficial merchant flag, which was used in the colony (later renamed Tasmania) prior to the adoption of the current Tasmanian Flag in 1875. The earliest known reference to the Van Diemen's Land Ensign is from an 1850s flag chart by Captain John Nicholson, Harbour Master of Sydney. The flag is similar in design to the, which is believed to also be the historical origin of the Murray River Flag.

== See also ==
- List of Australian flags
- Union Flag
