= Saint George's Day in England =

History of the feast day of in England

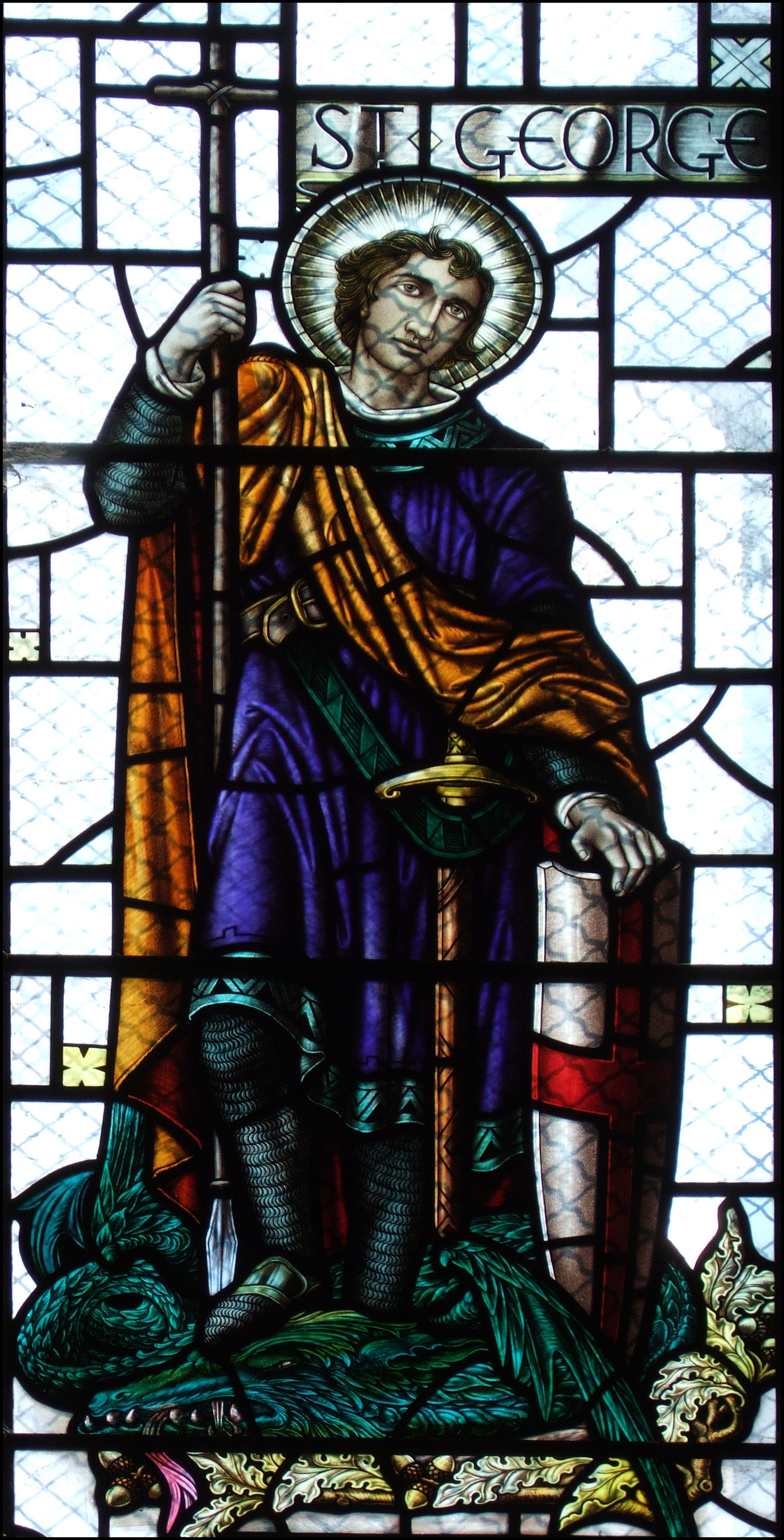
- Saint George depicted in a stained glass window in the St Mary the Virgin's Church, South Darley, Derbyshire.
- Observed by: 23 countries around the world English people, Church of England, Catholic Church in England and Wales
- Significance: Feast day of Saint George as national saint of England
- Celebrations: Church services, celebration of English culture
- Date: 23 April
- Next time: 23 April 2027
- Frequency: annual
- Related to: St George's Day in other countries

Saint George is the patron saint of England in a tradition established in the Tudor period, based in the saint's popularity during the times of the Crusades and the Hundred Years' War.

Veneration of the saint in folk religion declined in the 18th century. Attempts to revive the celebration of Saint George's Day (23 April) as an expression of English culture and identity date from the foundation of Royal Society of St. George in 1894. Since the beginning of the 2010s, such efforts have resulted in St George's Day celebrations with aspects of a national holiday in England.

== Religious observance ==
Religious observance of St George's Day changes when it is too close to Easter. According to the Church of England's calendar, when St George's Day falls between Palm Sunday and the Second Sunday of Easter inclusive, it is moved to the Monday after the Second Sunday of Easter. In 2011, for example, 23 April was Holy Saturday, so St George's Day was moved to Monday 2 May, and in 2014 it was celebrated on Monday 28 April. The Roman Catholic Church in England and Wales has a similar practice.

== History ==
=== Medieval history ===
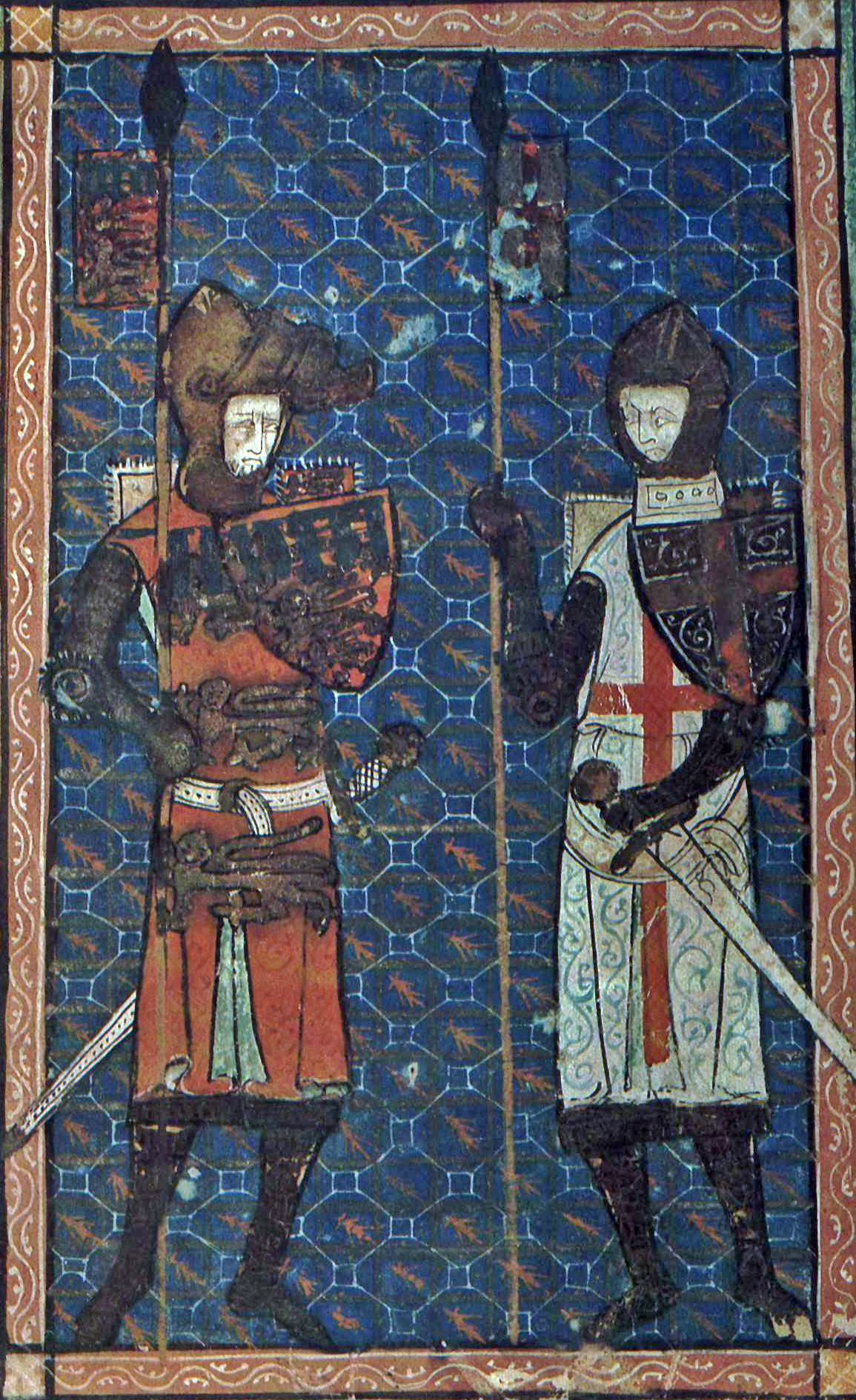
St George with an earl of Lancaster (probably Edmund Crouchback), from an English Book of Hours, c. 1330.

The earliest documented mention of St George in England comes from the Venerable Bede (d. 735). His feast day is also mentioned in the Durham Collectar, a 9th-century liturgical work. The will of Alfred the Great is said to refer to the saint, in a reference to the church of Fordington, Dorset. Early (c. 10th century) dedications of churches to St George are noted in England, for example at Fordington, Dorset, at Thetford, Southwark, and Doncaster.

St George rose to high popularity as a warrior saint during the time of the Crusades, but he had no special identity as a patron saint of England during the High Middle Ages. The saints most closely associated with England until the 14th century were Edward the Confessor and Edmund the Martyr.

In 1348, Edward III gave St George a special position as a patron saint of the Order of the Garter in thanks for his supposed intervention at the Battle of Crécy.

From that time, his banner was used with increasing prominence alongside the Royal Banner and became a fixed element in the hoist of the Royal Standard.

St George's Chapel at Windsor Castle was built by Edward IV and Henry VII in honour of the order. The badge of the Order shows Saint George on horseback slaying the dragon. Froissart observed the English invoking St. George as a battle cry on several occasions during the Hundred Years' War (1337–1453). Certain English soldiers displayed the pennon of St George.

St. George's feast day in England was no different from the numerous saints on the liturgical calendar until the Late Middle Ages. In the past, historians mistakenly pointed to the Synod of Oxford in 1222 as elevating the feast to special prominence, but the earliest manuscripts of the synod's declaration do not mention the feast of St George.

St George's Day was elevated to a "double major feast" in the declarations of the Province of Canterbury in 1415 and the Province of York in 1421, but George was still eclipsed by his "rivals" Saints Edward and Edmund.

=== Tudor period ===
[1552] where as it hathe bene of ane olde costome that sent Gorge shulde be kepte holy day thorrow alle Englond, the byshoppe of London commandyd that it shulde not be kepte, and no more it was not.

— Chronicle of the Grey Friars of London

The position of St George as patron saint of England was respected during the English Reformation, when all other religious flags were abolished, including all saints' banners, except for his. The first recorded use of St. George's Cross as an English maritime flag, in conjunction with royal banners, dates to 1545. In 1606 it was combined with the Scottish St. Andrew's Cross to form the Union Jack.

In his play Henry V, William Shakespeare has the title character utter a now-famous invocation of the Saint at Harfleur prior to the battle of Agincourt (1415): "Follow your spirit, and upon this charge Cry 'God for Harry, England, and Saint George!'" At Agincourt many believed they saw Saint George fighting on the English side.

The Cross of St. George was flown in 1497 by John Cabot on his voyage to discover Newfoundland and later by Sir Francis Drake and Sir Walter Raleigh. In 1620 it was the flag that was flown on the foremast of the Mayflower (with the early Union Flag combining St. George's Cross of England with St. Andrew's Saltire of Scotland on the mainmast) when the Pilgrim Fathers arrived in Plymouth, Massachusetts.

=== Early modern and modern history ===
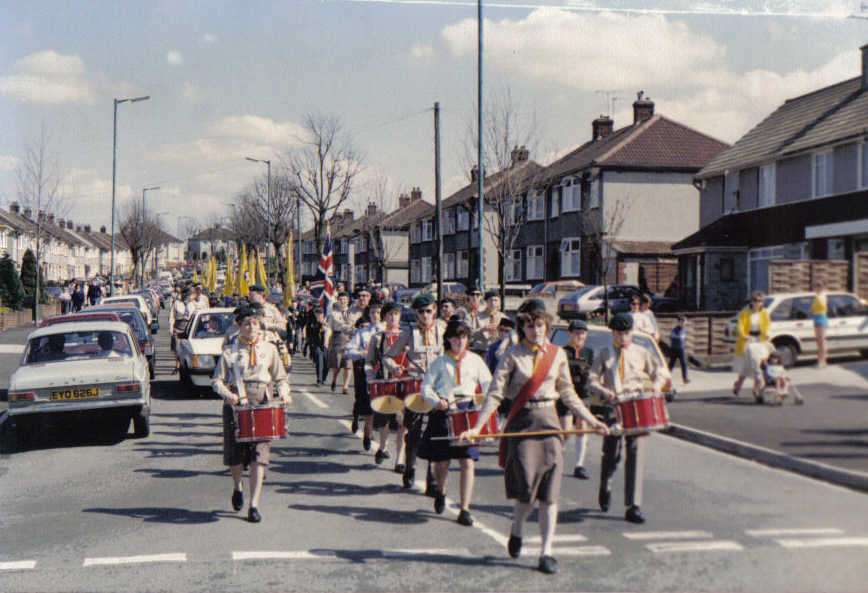
A Scout St George's Day Parade in Bristol, 1986.

The rural tradition of Pace Egg plays, which feature Saint George as the character of the "hero", is recorded in the early 17th century. The tradition of celebrating St George's Day had waned by the end of the 18th century after the union of England and Scotland. The Royal Society of St. George was founded in 1894, dedicated to promoting English culture, including St George's Day.

A traditional custom on St George's day is to wear a red rose in one's lapel, though this is no longer widely practised.

St George was selected by founder Robert Baden-Powell as the patron saint of the Scout movement, and British scouting organisations such as The Scout Association continue to celebrate St George's Day. Most Scout districts host events on the Sunday closest to St George's Day, often a parade and religious service for their members.

== Contemporary revival ==
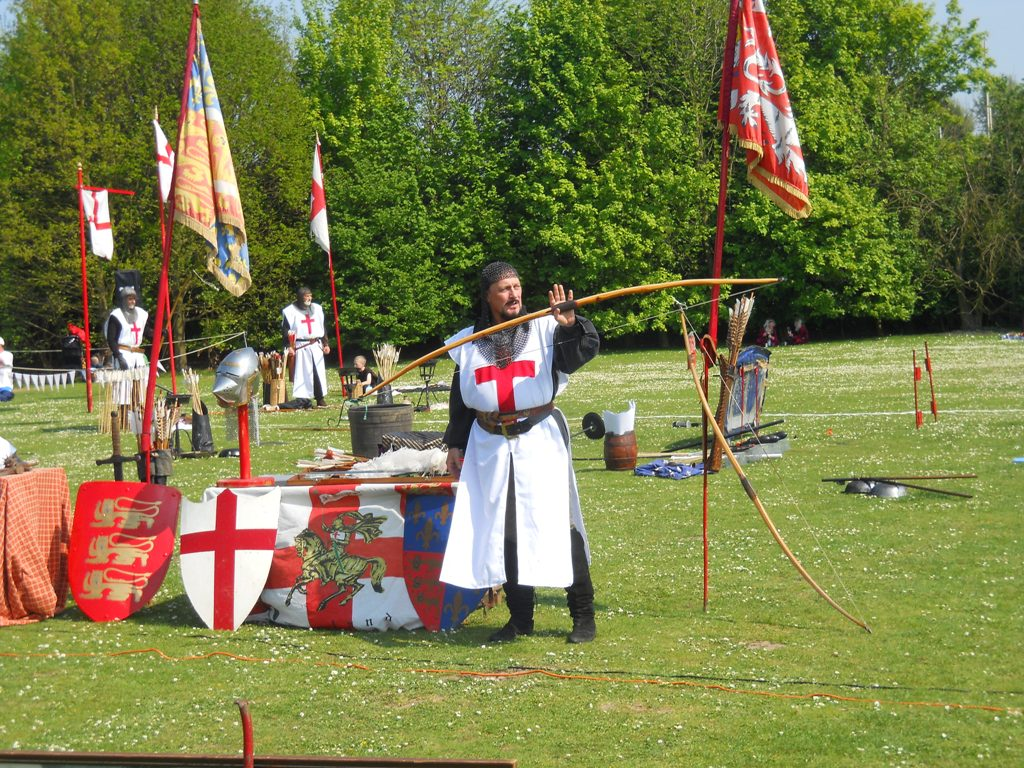
St George's Day festival in Kent.

A certain revival of the position of St George as the patron saint of England has been observed since the mid-1990s. Notably, the Flag of England (the Saint George's Cross), which in the 1980s had mostly been reserved for political English nationalism, began to be displayed by football fans as representing England during the 1996 European Championships that were held in that country. The flag is now regularly used by fans at sporting events, and flown by churches, local authorities and other bodies.

In parallel, a revival of St George's Day as an English national holiday has been encouraged by organisations such as English Heritage and the Royal Society of Saint George, partly in reaction to calls to replace St George as patron saint of England. A 2003 BBC Radio 4 poll on the subject revealed some interest in replacing him.

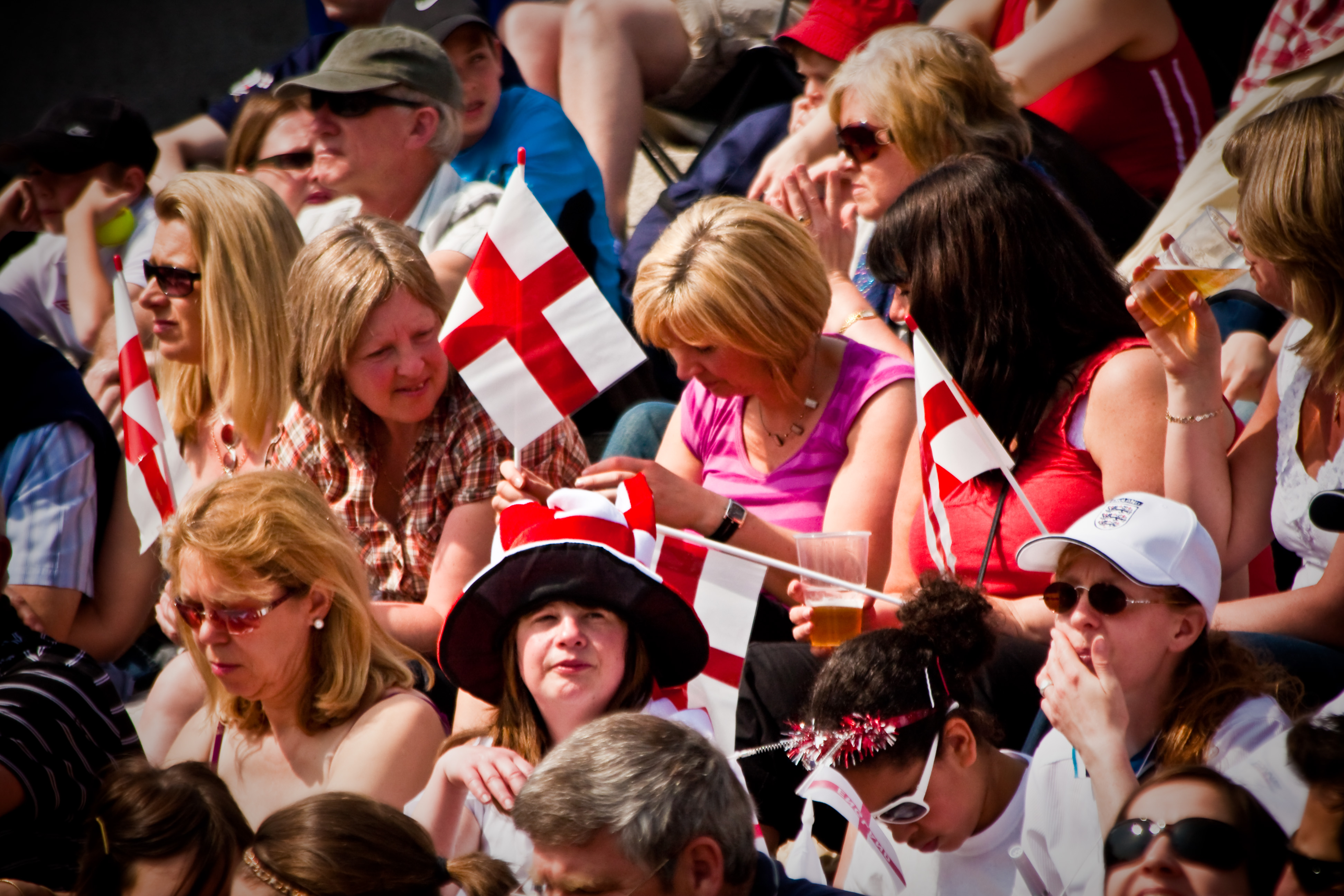
A crowd celebrates Saint George's Day at an event in Trafalgar Square in 2010

On St George's Day 2002, the Campaign for an English Parliament arranged to dye the fountains red on St. George's Day. From this effort, supporters privately organised a St George's Feast in London, the first of which was held in Covent Garden on 23 April 2003. The festival grew in size and importance during 2004 to 2008, including performances of traditional Punch and Judy shows, English folk dance Mummers Players, Morris dancers, English folk music, etc. The Royal Society of St George asked to contribute in the 2006 event, which was covered by BBC Radio 3.

In early 2009, Mayor of London Boris Johnson led a campaign to encourage the public celebration of St George's Day. The event was first officially held in 2010, announced as "the first Pageant of St George in 425 years". The event has since developed as a major festival centred on Trafalgar Square and organised by the Mayor of London.

In 2011, a campaign to make St. George's Day a public holiday in England began on the UK government's e-petition website. It received 4,266 signatures, not achieving the 100,000 signatures required before the deadline in August 2012 to qualify for a debate of the matter in the House of Commons.

In 2014, Andrew Rosindell, Conservative MP for Romford, argued in favour of giving St George's Day the status of an official public holiday.

In 2025, St. George's Holiday, a voluntary group seeking greater celebration of St. George's Day, noted a 35% increase in the number of St. George's Day celebrations in England compared to 2024.

The Labour Leader Jeremy Corbyn also promised to make St George's Day one of four new Bank Holidays in his party's 2017 election manifesto.

== Anniversaries on 23 April ==
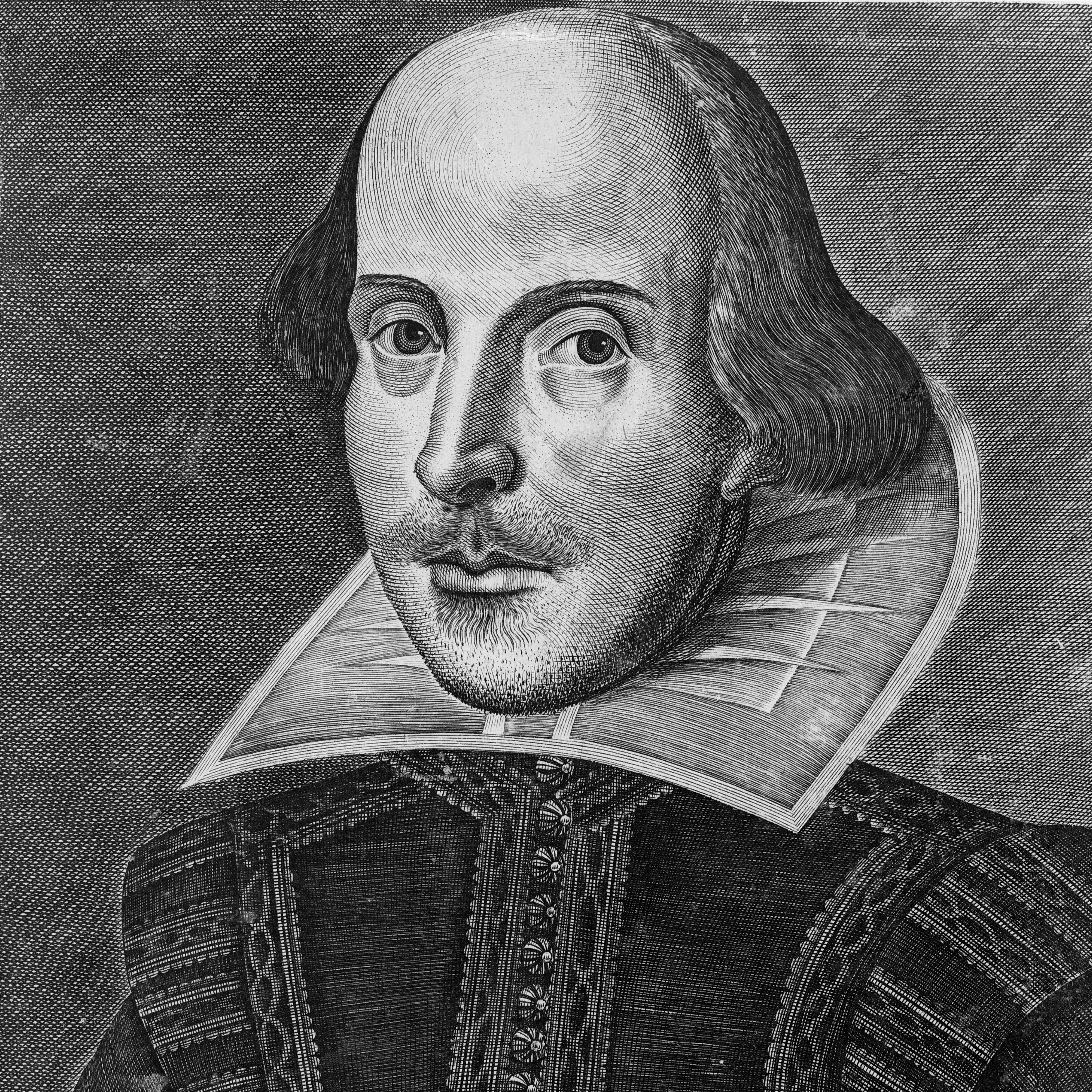
William Shakespeare's birthday is also celebrated on 23 April.

- Additional celebrations involve the commemoration of 23 April as William Shakespeare's birthday and death. Shakespeare is known to have been baptised on 26 April 1564 and to have died on 23 April 1616. 23 April is widely recognised as his traditional date of birth and commemorated on this day every year in his home Stratford upon Avon and throughout the world.

Other anniversaries include:

English history

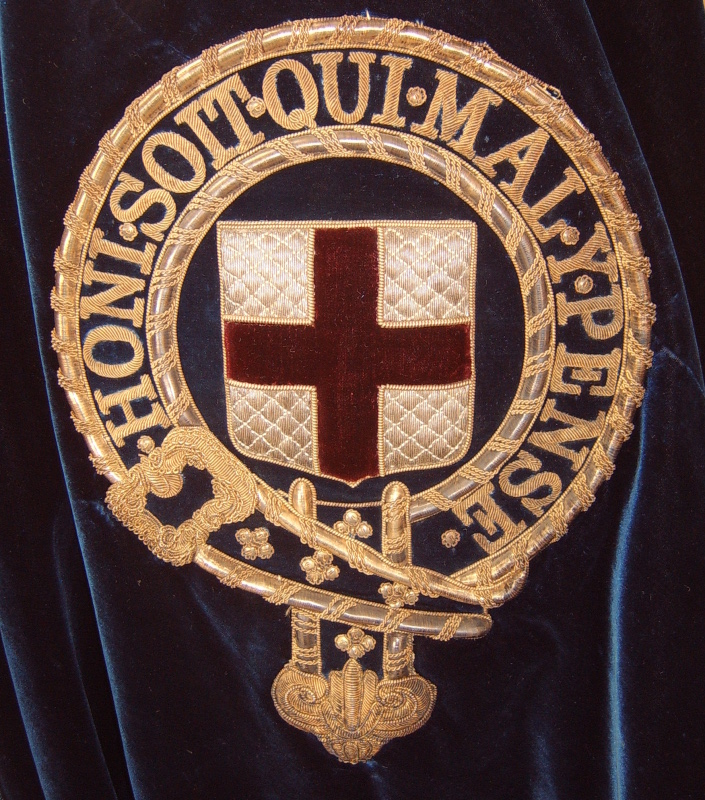
Badge of the Order of the Garter

- death of Wihtred, King of Kent (725)
- death of King Ethelred of Wessex (871) and accession of Alfred the Great
- 1016 death of Ethelred II of England (1016) and accession of Edmund Ironside
- on 23 April 1348 the Order of the Garter, the senior English order of knighthood, was founded with the flag of St George as its badge.
- in 1661 King Charles II of England was crowned in Westminster Abbey and on 23 April 1924 was the first broadcast by an English monarch (King George V at the opening of the British Empire Exhibition at Wembley).
- 1942 – World War II: Baedeker Blitz – German bombers hit Exeter, Bath and York

arts and literature

- birth of the artist J. M. W. Turner (1775–1851)
- death of the Romantic poet William Wordsworth (1770–1850)
- death of the Romantic poet Rupert Brooke (1887–1915).
- 1740 – Thomas Tickell, English writer (b. 1685)

sports

- death of cricketer Jim Laker (1986)
- death of cricketer Denis Compton (1997)

other

- death of the English Quaker leader Margaret Fell (1614-1702)
- death of the English general James Abercrombie (1706–81)
- birth of the English general Edmund Allenby (1861-1936)
- birth of Prince Louis of Wales (2018– )

== See also ==
- Oak Apple Day
- Trafalgar Day
- Saint Crispin's Day
- Feast day of St Thomas Becket
- May Day in England
- Minden Day
- Saint Andrew's Day
- Saint David's Day
- Saint Patrick's Day
