= Tony Linsell =

Tony Linsell is an English publisher, writer and political activist.

Linsell graduated from the London School of Economics. In 1998 he and five others founded the Campaign for an English Parliament.

He was a co-founder of the Steadfast journal, and became a trustee of the Steadfast Trust, founded in 2005, which describes itself as "the first and only registered charity which undertakes work specifically for the ethnic English community".

He was interviewed by Darcus Howe in the second episode of Channel 4's three-part documentary series White Tribe, which aired in 2000.

In 2002 Linsell became a founding member of the English Democrats Party. He later left, and has openly criticised some of the material published by the party.

In January 2010 he was asked by Andrew Constantine to join the English Independence Party, which Constantine had recently taken control of. Linsell agreed and was installed as Party chairman.

Tony Linsell has written or edited several books. Amongst them are Views from the English Community, which contains writing by himself, T.P. Bragg, Oliver Postgate and others; and Our Englishness, in which seven authors discuss the subject of English identity.

== Books ==
- Anglo-Saxon Runes (1993)
- Anglo-Saxon Mythology, Migration & Magic (1995)
- An English Nationalism (2000)
- Our Englishness (Editor, 2000)
- Anglo-Saxon Rune Cards (With Brian Partridge, 2003)
- Views from the English Community (Editor, 2005)
