= Flag of England =

- Use: National flag
- Proportion: 3:5
- Adopted: 1552
- Design: A white field with centred red cross. Argent, a cross gules

The national flag of England, a constituent country of the United Kingdom, is derived from Saint George's Cross (heraldic blazon: Argent, a cross gules). The association of the red cross as an emblem of England can be traced back to the Late Middle Ages when it was gradually, increasingly, used alongside the Royal Banner. It became the only saint's flag permitted to be flown in public as part of the English Reformation and at a similar time became the pre-eminent maritime flag referred to as a White Ensign. It was used as a component in the design of the Union Jack in 1606.

== Origins ==
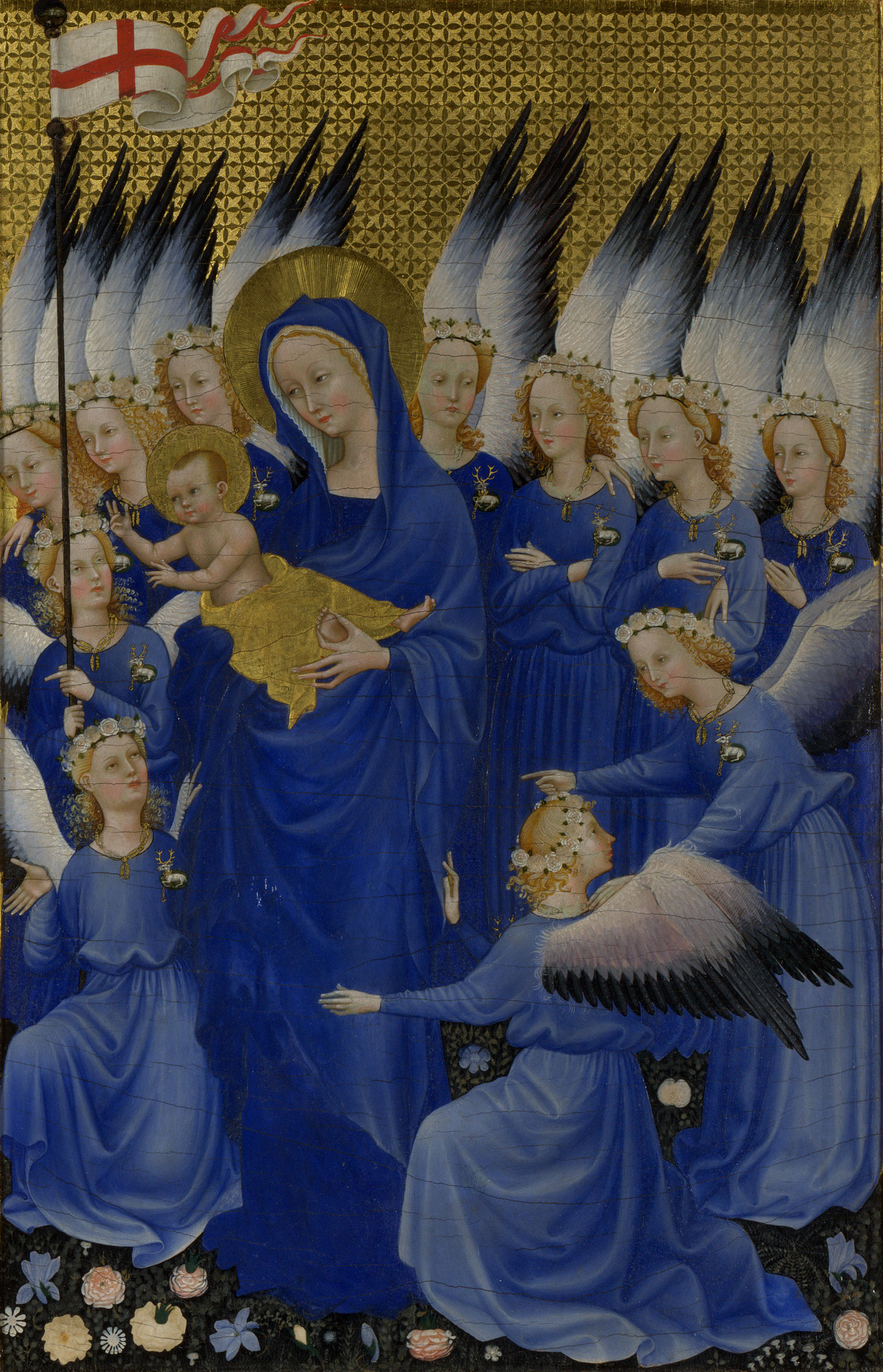
Angels wearing the heraldic badge of King Richard II holding the flag of Saint George surmounted by an orb displaying a miniature map of England. Wilton Diptych (c. 1395–1399)

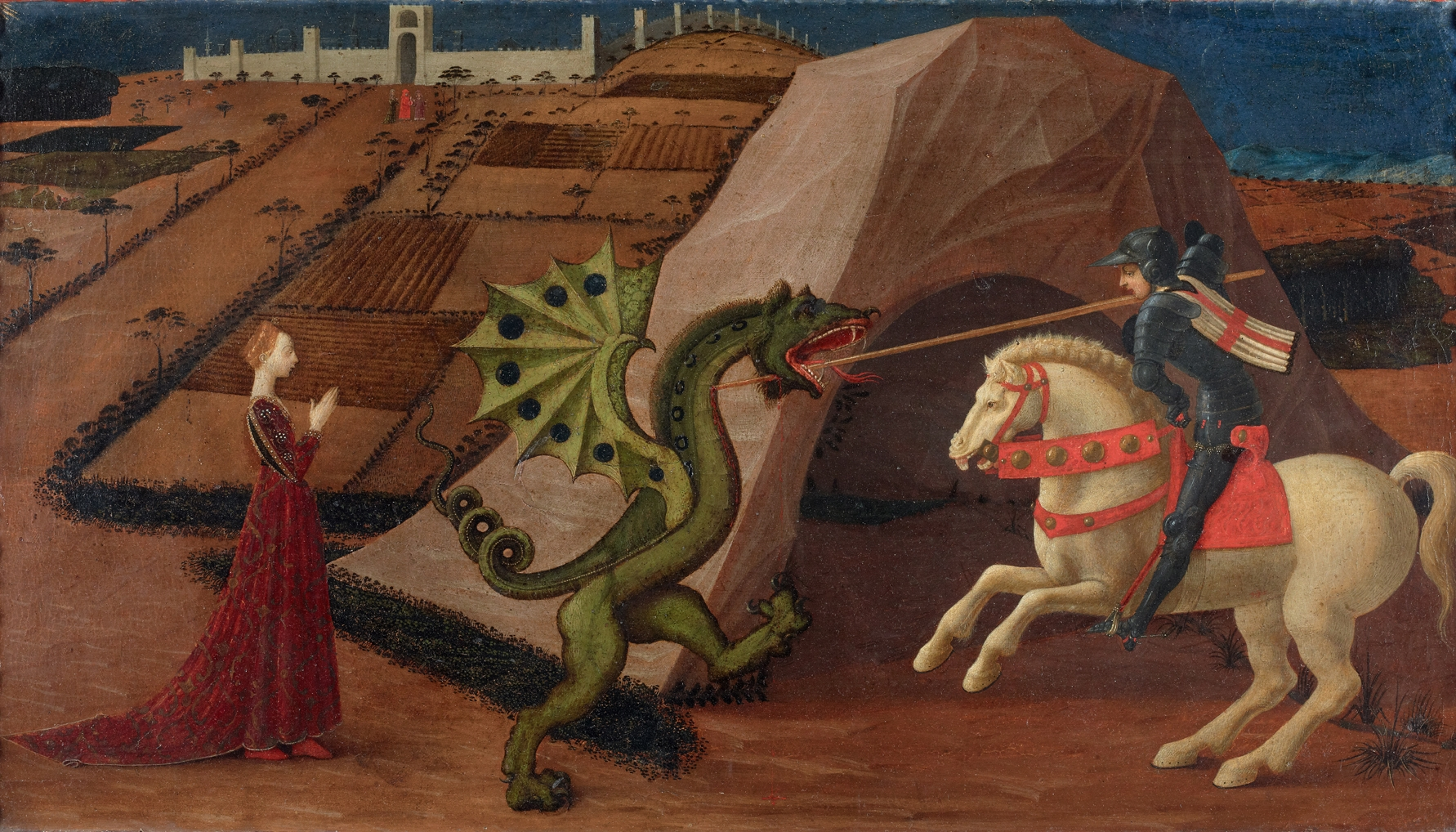
Saint George seen in the act of slaying the dragon. He is depicted wearing a jupon displaying St George's Cross. Paolo Uccello (c. 1460)

Illustration of Saint George's Cross, used alongside the Royal Standard by Wat Tyler's rebels. Froissart's Chronicles BL Royal 18 E.I, fol. 165v, c. 1470

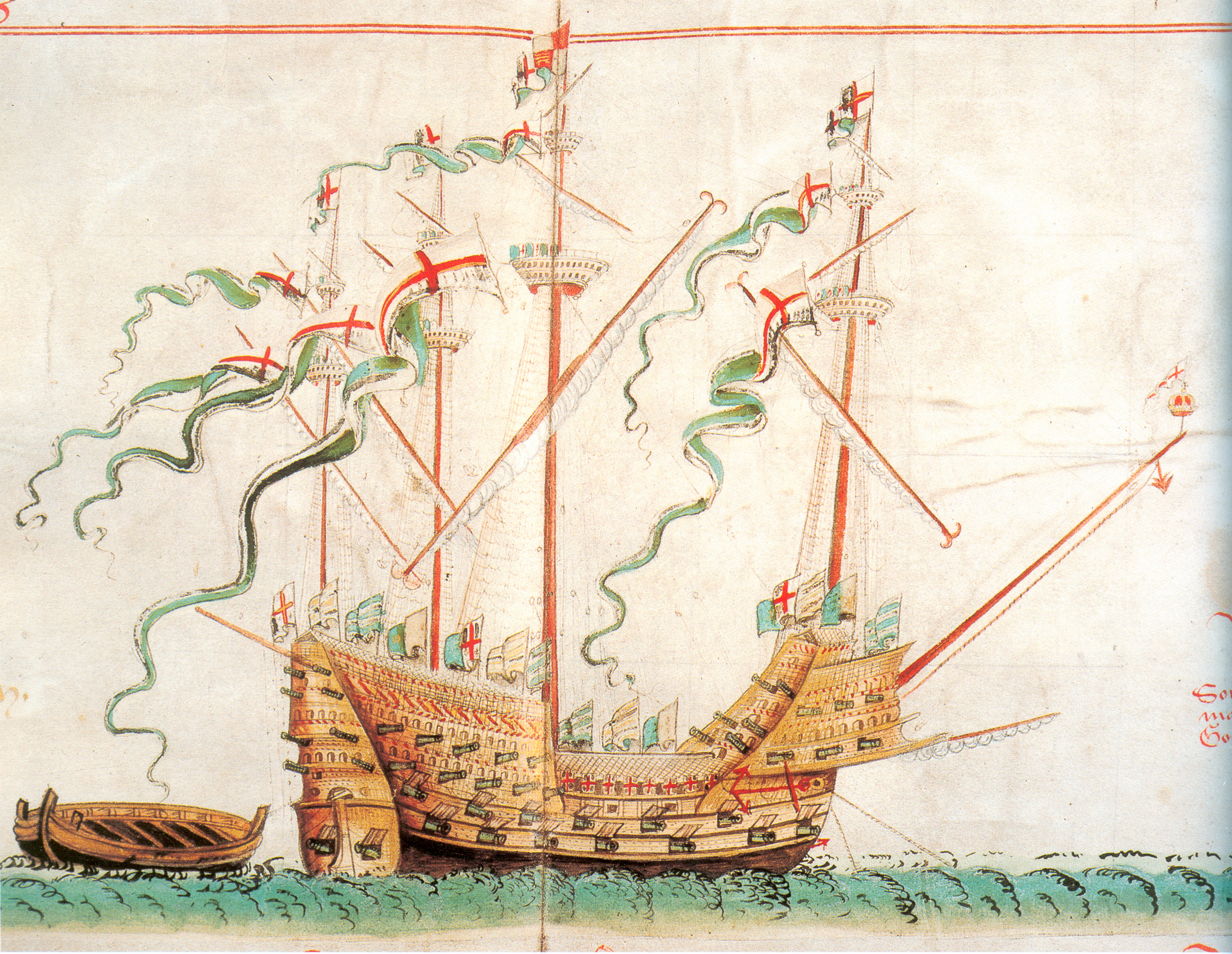
The Tudor navy carrack Henry Grace à Dieu (launched 1514) as depicted in the 1546 Anthony Roll, with St George's Cross displayed on the streamers.

On 21 January 1188, Henry II of England and Philip II of France agreed to go on a crusade, and that Henry would use a white cross and Philip a red cross.

There then follows a historiographical tradition claiming that Richard the Lionheart himself adopted the full red cross flag and the patron saint from the Republic of Genoa at some point during his crusade. This idea can be traced to the Victorian era, Perrin (1922) refers to it as a "common belief", and it is still popularly repeated today even though it cannot be substantiated. Prince Edward, Duke of Kent made a variation to this in a bilingual preface to a brochure made for the British Pavilion at Genoa Expo '92. The relevant passage read:

The St. George's flag, a red cross on a white field, was adopted by England and the City of London in 1190 for their ships entering the Mediterranean to benefit from the protection of the Genoese fleet. The English Monarch paid an annual tribute to the Doge of Genoa for this privilege

Red crosses seem to have been used as a distinguishing mark worn by English soldiers from the reign of Edward I (1270s), or perhaps slightly earlier, in the Battle of Evesham of 1265, using a red cross on their uniforms to distinguish themselves from the white crosses used by the rebel barons at the Battle of Lewes a year earlier. Perrin notes a roll of accounts from 1277 where the purchase of cloth for the king's tailor is identified as destined for the manufacture of a large number of pennoncels (pennons attached to lances) and bracers (worn by archers on their left forearms) "of the arms of Saint George" for the use by the king's foot soldiers (pro peditibus regis). Perrin concludes from this that the introduction of the Cross of St George as a "national emblem" is originally due to Edward I. By 1300, there was also a greater "banner of Saint George", but not yet in a prominent function; the king used it among especially banners of king-saints Saint Edward the Confessor and Saint Edmund the Martyr alongside the royal banner. George had become popular as a "warrior saint" during the Crusades, but the saint most closely associated with England was Edward the Confessor. This was so until the time of Edward III, who in thanks for Saint George's supposed intervention in his favour at the Battle of Crécy gave him a special position as a patron saint of the inceptive Order of the Garter in 1348. From that time, his banner was used with increasing prominence alongside the Royal Banner and became a fixed element in the hoist of the Royal Standard. Yet the flag shown for England in the Book of All Kingdoms of 1367 is solid red (while Saint George's Cross is shown for Nice and, in a five-cross version, for Tbilisi). The Wilton Diptych from the late 1390s shows a swallow-tailed Saint George cross pennant held by an angel in between (the then reigning) King Richard II (accompanied by Edward the Confessor and Edmund the Martyr) and a scene of the Virgin and Child flanked by angels wearing Richard's own heraldic devices.

Saint George's Day was considered a "double major feast" from 1415, but George was still eclipsed by his "rivals" Saints Edward and Edmund.

John Cabot, commissioned by Henry VII to sail "under our banners, flags and ensigns", may have taken a Saint George's banner to Newfoundland in 1497.

That Saint George is the primary patron saint of England is among several lasting changes of height of the English Protestant Reformation, via the content which the teenage king and his Protestant advisors issued to all churches and clerics. These rules were the revised prayer book of 1552. Just as with the Marian persecutions (four years of counter-revolution after his natural death) all defecting clerics faced likely deprivation which was the loss of their office and if more broadly heretical, burning at the stake. The book made clear all religious flags, including saints' banners except for Saint George were abolished.

Further use of this cross as a maritime flag alongside royal banners, is found in 1545.

Henry V, the history play by William Shakespeare, believed to have been written near 1599 includes the fictitious scene of the siege of Harfleur where the king's final rally is:

Cry 'God for Harry, England, and Saint George!"
[Exeunt. Alarum, and chambers go off.]

thus promoting the notion that the cult or festivities specifically to the saint, or focus on the Order of the Garter put him significantly ahead of two other national saints – instead of depicting that they were approximately equal. The quote became rapidly well known in London, across social classes, and thus imagery entrenched that Saint George was "historically" the primary saint.

In 1606, after the Union of the Crowns in 1603, it was combined with the Scottish St Andrew's Cross to form the Union Jack, which James VI & I ordered be flown from the main tops of ships from both England and Scotland. The "Red Crosse" continued to be flown from the fore-top by James' subjects in "South Britaine"—i.e., the Saint George cross was used with the new union flag on English vessels.

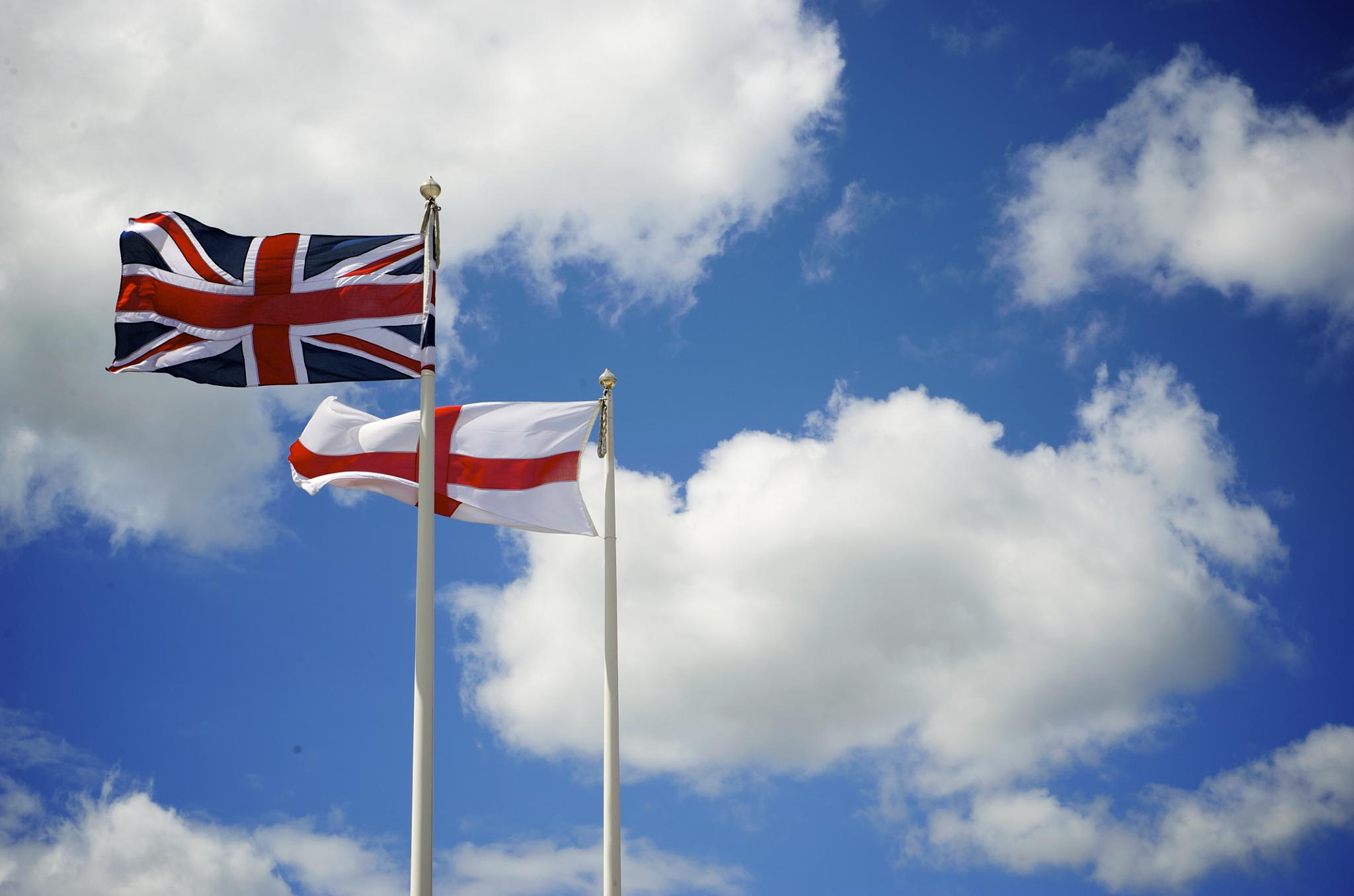
The flag of England flying alongside the flag of the United Kingdom in Southsea, Portsmouth, in July 2008

In the 19th century, it became desirable for all nations of Europe (and later worldwide) to identify a national flag. During that time, the terms Britain and England were used largely interchangeably, the Union Flag was used as national flag de facto, even though never officially adopted. The observation that the Cross of St George is the "national flag of England" (as opposed to the Union Flag being the flag of all of the United Kingdom) was made in the context of Irish irredentism, as noted by G. K. Chesterton in 1933:

As a very sensible Irishman said in a letter to a Dublin paper: "The Union Jack is not the national flag of England." The national flag of England is the Cross of St. George; and that, oddly enough, was splashed from one end of Dublin to the other; it was mostly displayed on shield-shaped banners, and may have been regarded by many as merely religious.

== Derived flags ==
=== Union Flag ===
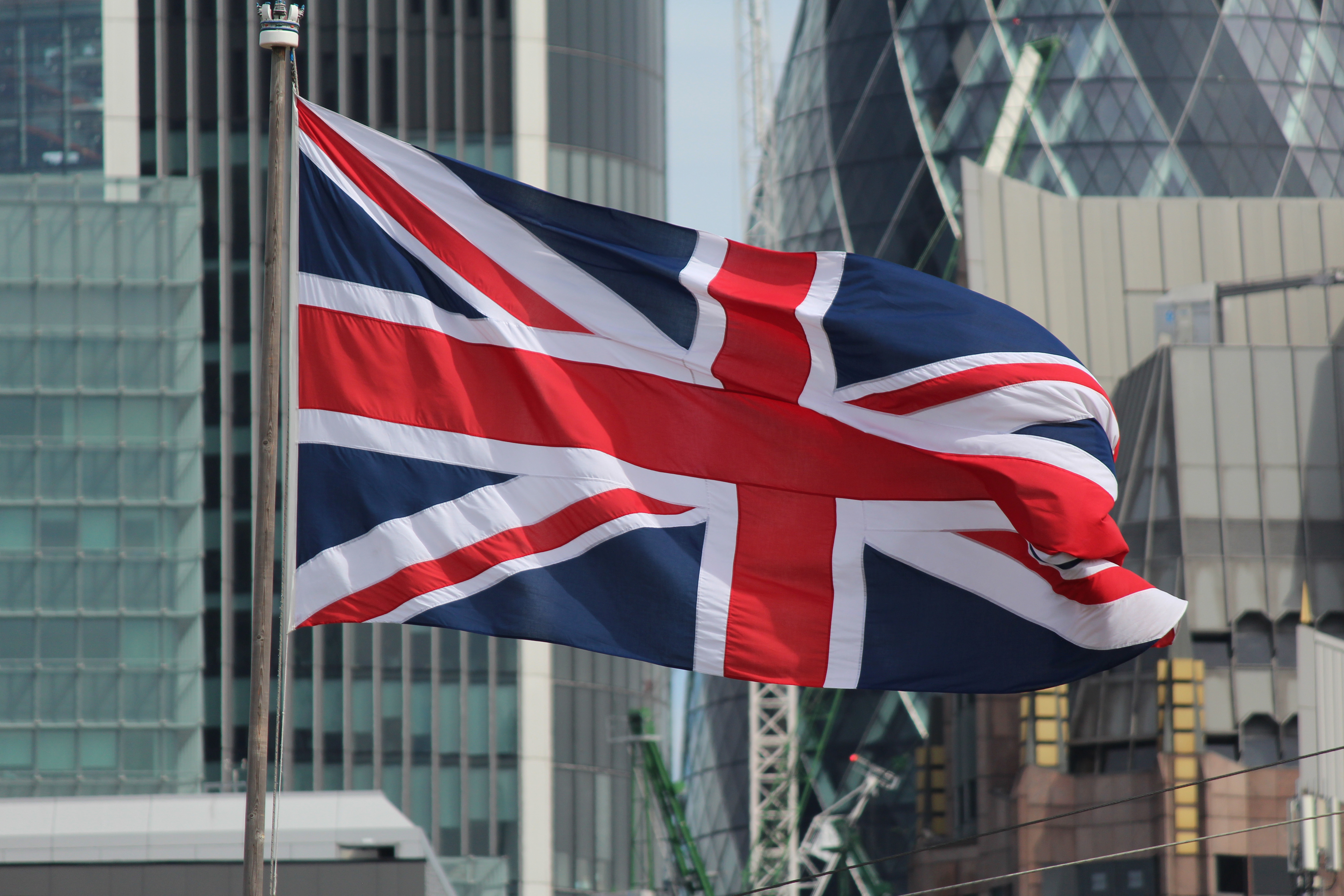
The Union Flag

The flag of England is one of the key components of the Union Flag. The Union Flag has been used in a variety of forms since the proclamation by Orders in Council 1606, when the flags of Scotland and England were first merged to symbolise the Union of the Crowns. (The Union of the Crowns having occurred in 1603). In Scotland, and in particular on Scottish vessels at sea, historical evidence suggests that a separate design of Union Flag was flown to that used in England.

In the Acts of Union of 1707, which united the Kingdom of Scotland and the Kingdom of England to become the Kingdom of Great Britain, it was declared that "the Crosses of St. George and St. Andrew be conjoined, in such Manner as her Majesty shall think fit, and used in all Flags, Banners, Standards and Ensigns, both at Sea and Land."

From 1801, to symbolise the union of the Kingdom of Great Britain with the Kingdom of Ireland, a new design which included St Patrick's Cross was adopted for the flag of the United Kingdom of Great Britain and Ireland. The Flag of the United Kingdom, having remained unchanged following the partition of Ireland in 1921 and creation of the Irish Free State and Northern Ireland, continues to be used as the flag of the United Kingdom of Great Britain and Northern Ireland.

Saint George's Cross. In the Union Flag this represents the entire Kingdom of England, including Wales.

English version of the first Union Flag, (1606), used in the Kingdom of England and, from 1707, adopted as flag of the unified Kingdom of Great Britain.

The Scottish version of the first Union Flag saw limited use in the Kingdom of Scotland from 1606 to 1707, following the Union of the Crowns.

The second Union Flag, (1801), incorporated the Cross of Saint Patrick, following the Union of the Kingdom of Great Britain and Kingdom of Ireland.

The construction of the 1801 Union Flag, showing its three component flags.

=== City of London ===
The flag of the City of London is based on the English flag, having a centred St George's Cross on a white background, with a red sword in the upper hoist canton (the top left quarter). The sword is believed to represent the sword that was used to behead Saint Paul, who is the patron saint of the city.

Flag of the City of London

=== Royal Navy ===
The flag used by the British Royal Navy (the White Ensign) is also based on the flag of England, consisting of St George's Cross with a Union Flag in the canton. In addition to the United Kingdom, several countries in the Commonwealth of Nations also have variants of the White Ensign with their own national flags in the canton, with St George's Cross sometimes being replaced by a naval badge.

White Ensign of the Royal Navy

=== Universities of England ===
Flag of the University of Bristol

Three flags of England appear on the castle in the flag of the University of East Anglia

Flag of the University of Hull

Flag of the University of London

== Contemporary use ==
=== Church of England ===
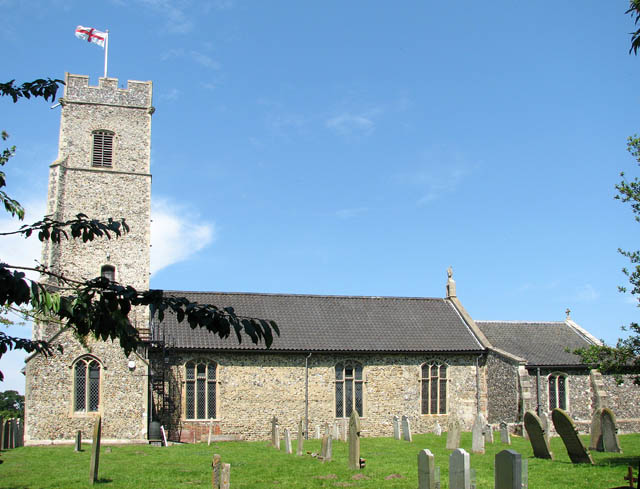
Flag flying on All Saints' Church, Shotesham

Churches belonging to the Church of England which have a pole may fly St George's Cross. A desirable variant (per an order from the Earl Marshal in 1938) is for the church to fly the flag with the arms of the diocese in the left-hand upper corner.

Flag of the Diocese of Bath and Wells

Flag of the Diocese of Birmingham

Flag of the Diocese of Blackburn

Flag of the Diocese of Bristol

Flag of the Diocese of Canterbury

Flag of the Diocese of Carlisle

Flag of the Diocese of Chelmsford

Flag of the Diocese of Chester

Flag of the Diocese of Derby

Flag of the Diocese of Ely

Flag of the Diocese of Exeter

Flag of the Diocese of Gibraltar in Europe

Flag of the Diocese of Gloucester

Flag of the Diocese of Guildford

Flag of the Diocese of Hereford

Flag of the Diocese of Leeds

Flag of the Diocese of Leicester

Flag of the Diocese of Lichfield

Flag of the Diocese of Lincoln

Flag of the Diocese of London

Flag of the Diocese of Manchester

Flag of the Diocese of Newcastle

Flag of the Diocese of Norwich

Flag of the Diocese of Oxford

Flag of the Diocese of Portsmouth

Flag of the Diocese of Rochester

Flag of the Diocese of Salisbury

Flag of the Diocese of Sheffield

Flag of the Diocese of Southwark

Flag of the Diocese of Southwell and Nottingham

Flag of the Diocese of St Albans

Flag of the Diocese of Truro

Flag of the Diocese of Winchester

Flag of the Diocese of Worcester

=== Sporting events ===
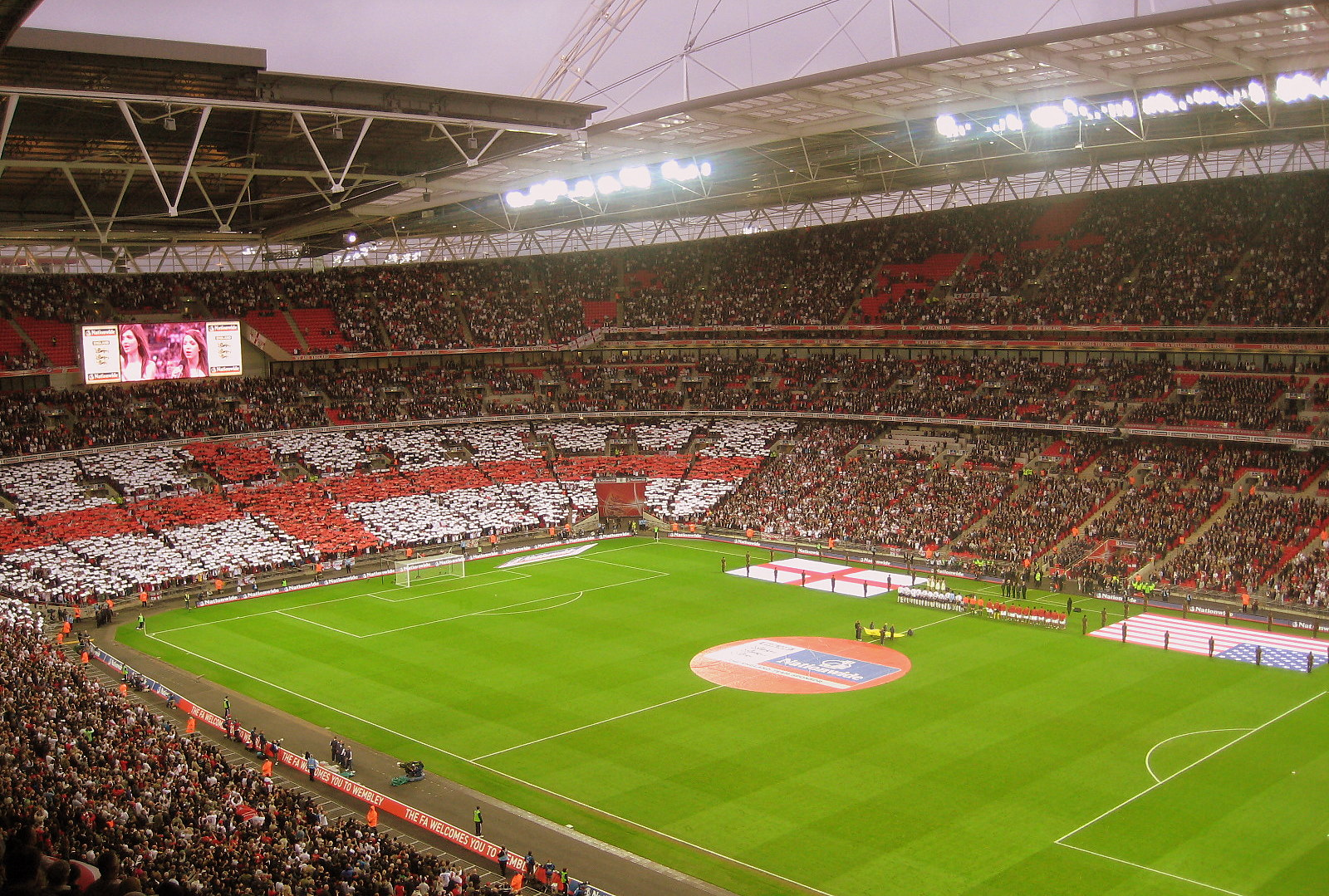
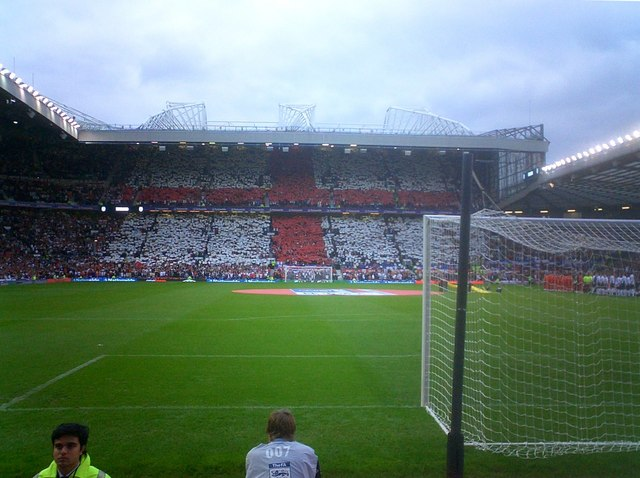
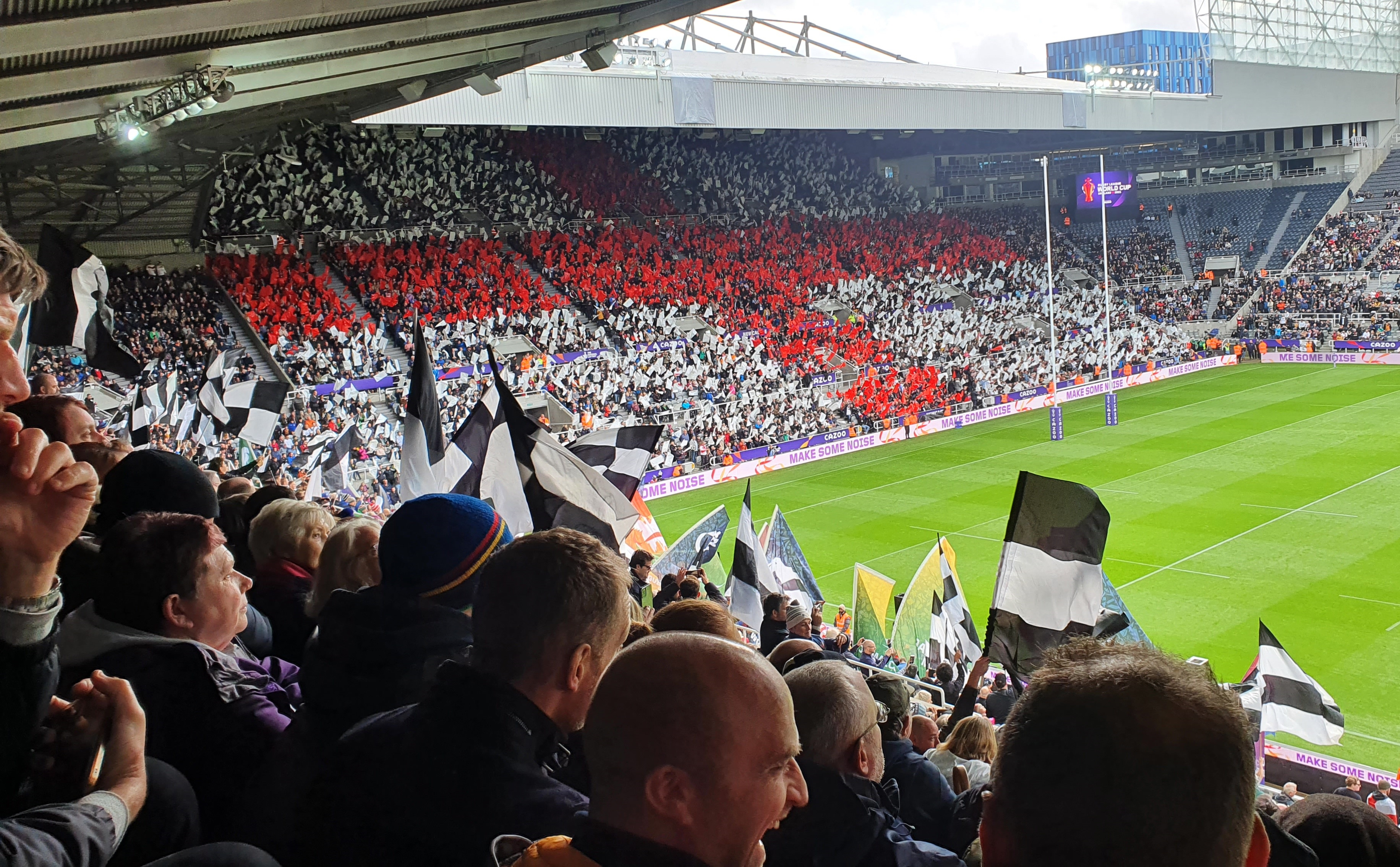
Sports fans creating Saint George's Cross during football games at Wembley Stadium and Old Trafford, and at a rugby league game at St James' Park.

The flag heavily dominates for that of England at sports events in which England competes, for example during England Cricket matches (the Cricket World Cup and The Ashes), during Rugby Union matches and in football. It is also used in icons on the internet and on the TV screen to represent teams and players from England.

For at least some decades before about 1996, most of the flags waved by supporters were Union Flags. In a sporting context, the flag is often seen being waved by supporters with the addition of 'ENGLAND' across its horizontal bar.

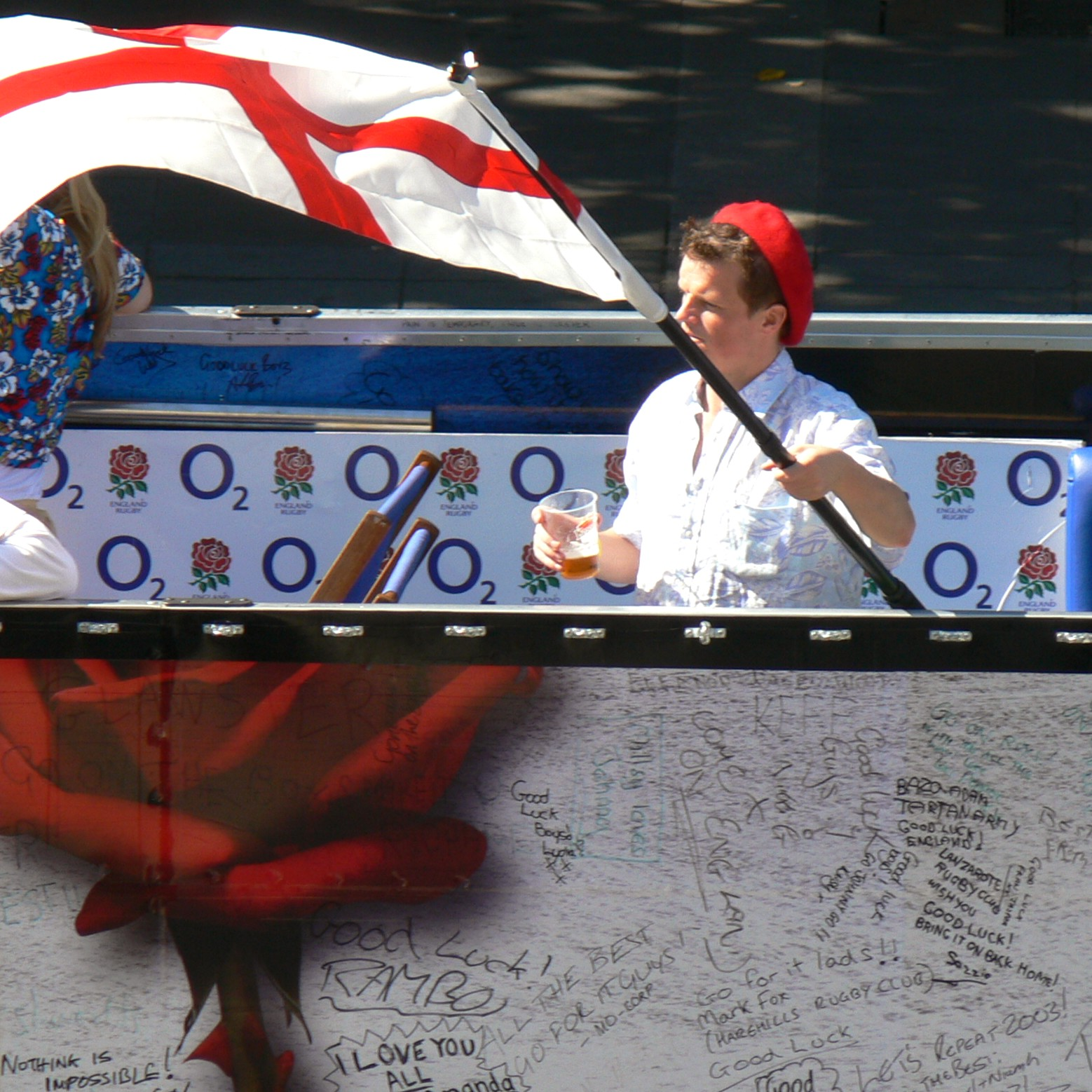
English Rugby team supporter waving the English flag in the streets of Nantes, France in 2007

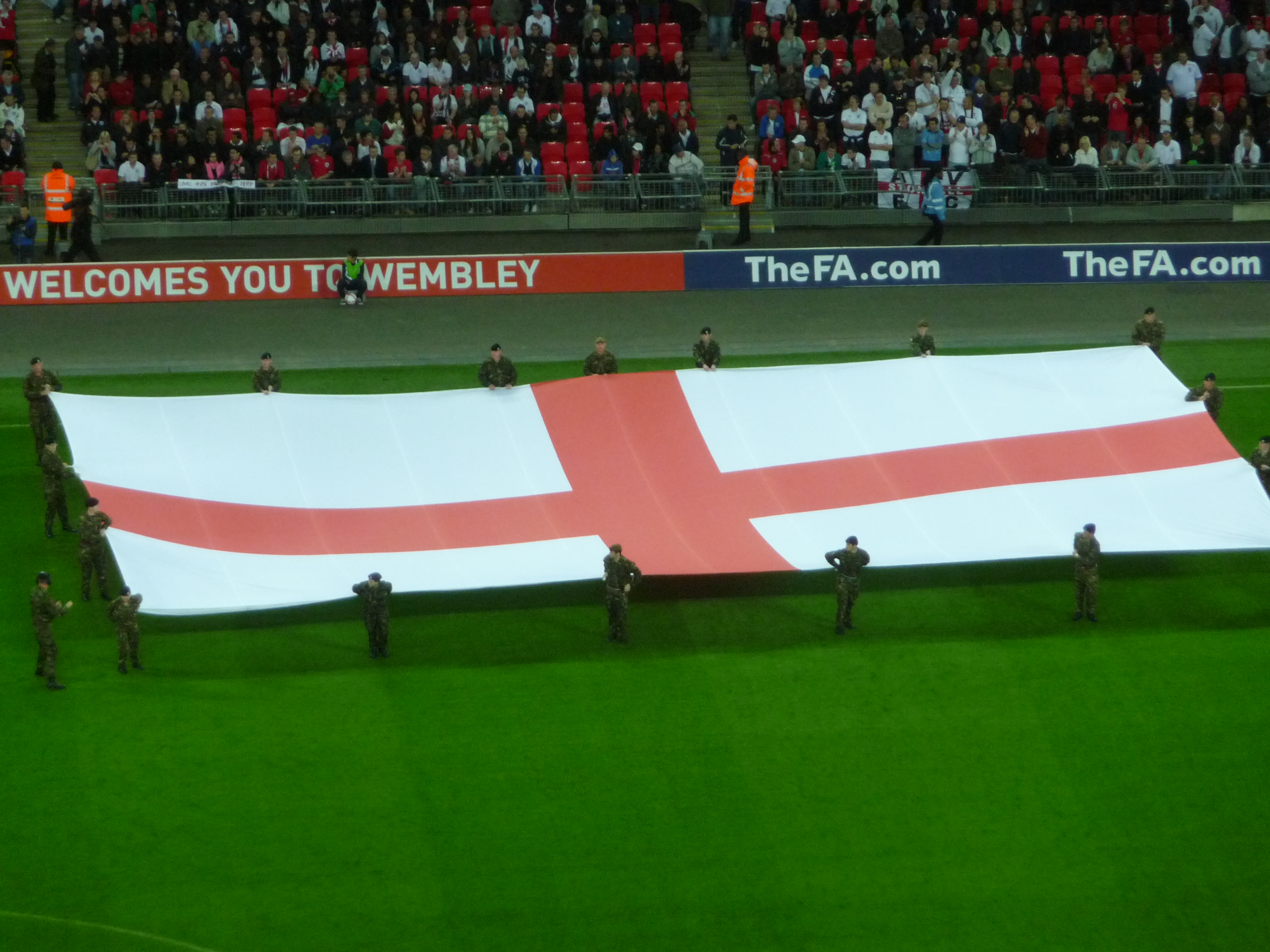
Giant England Flag at Wembley Stadium

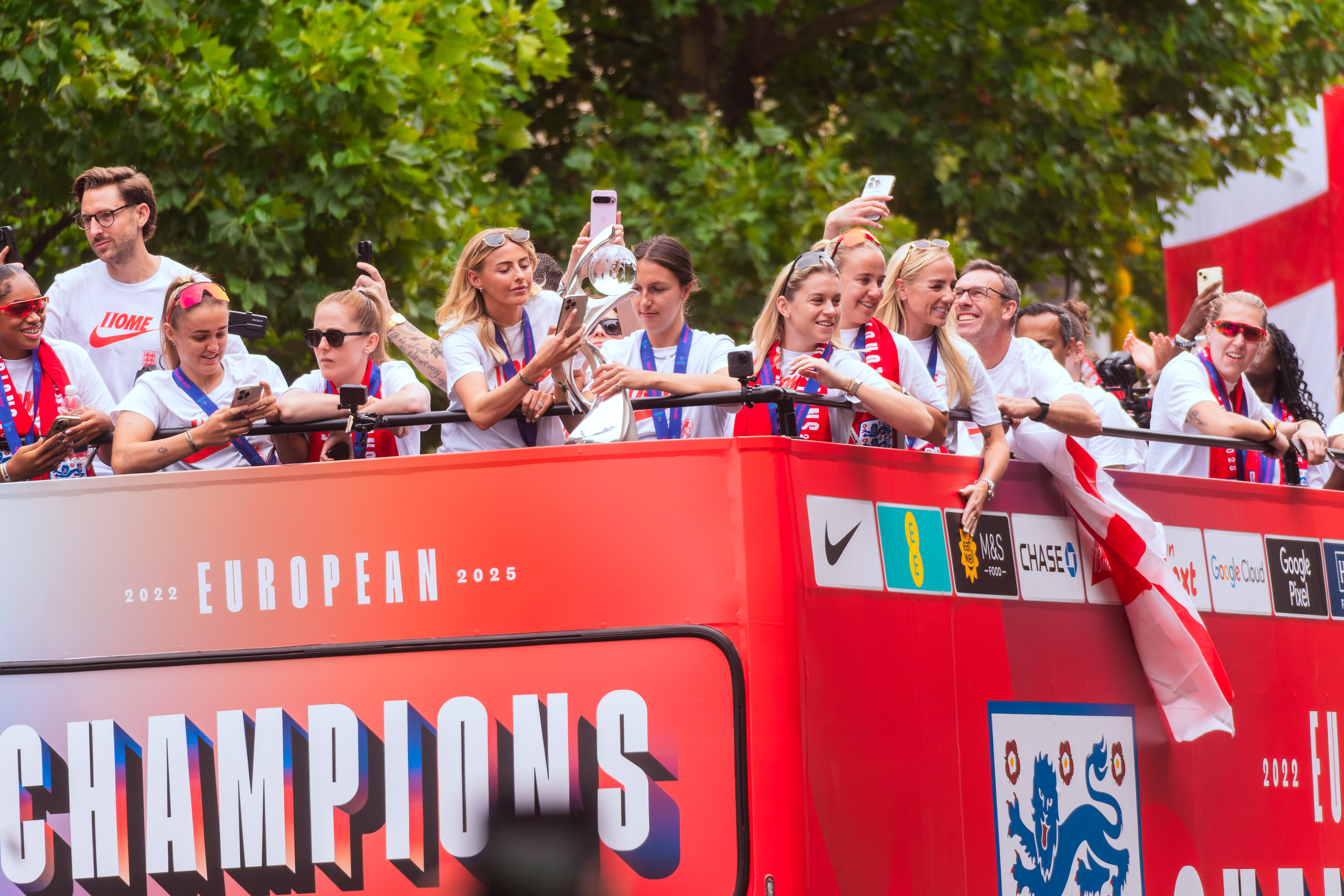
The Lionesses open top bus celebration following their winning UEFA Women's Euro 2025 tournament.

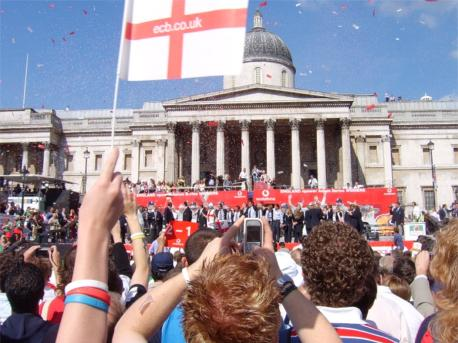
England cricket fans celebrate in Trafalgar Square, 2005.

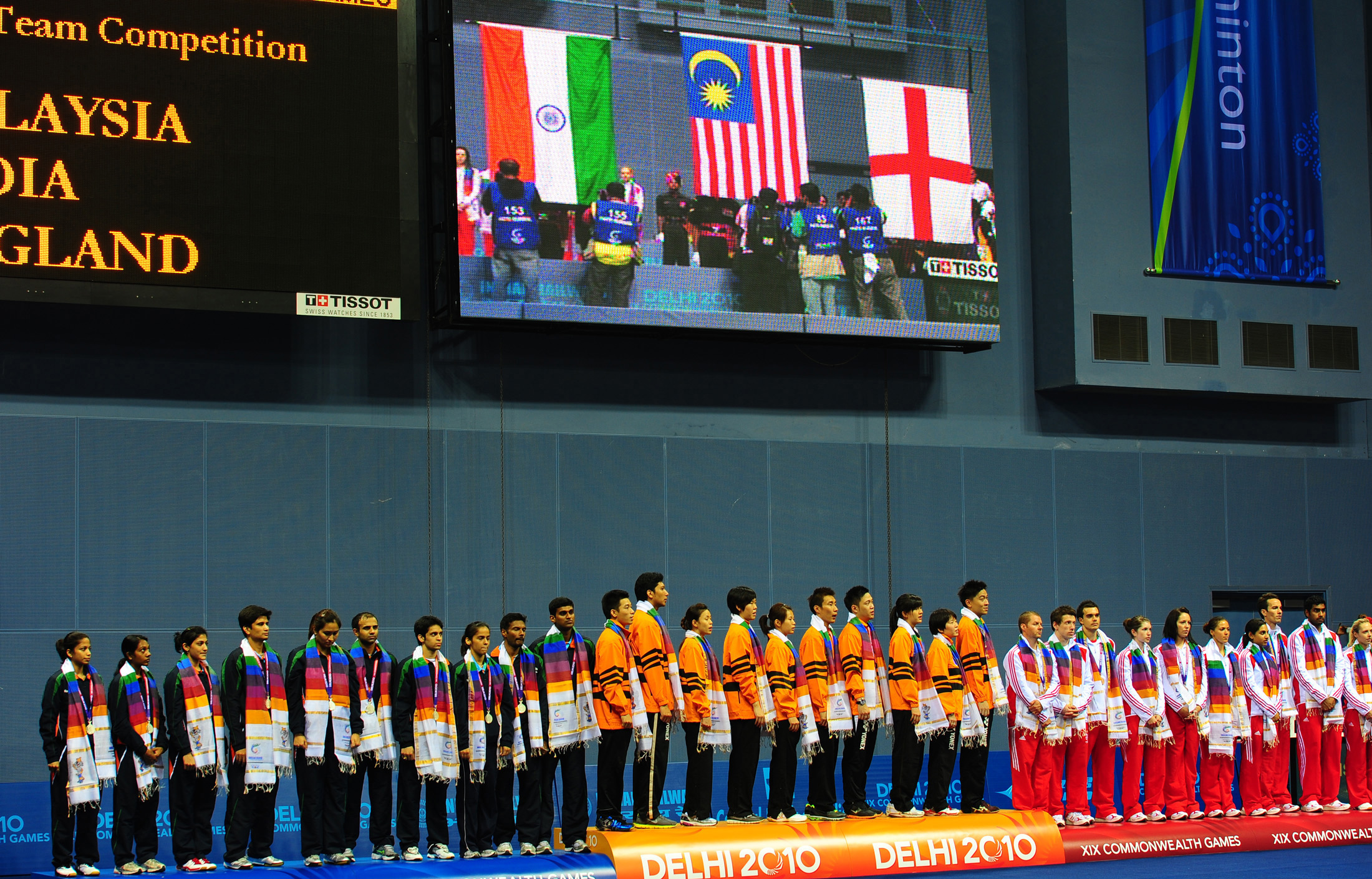
England Commonwealth Games badminton team on the winner's podium at the 2010 games.

=== English nationalism ===
Flag of the Campaign for an English Parliament

As the flag of England, it is used in English nationalism. This is largely in parallel to the use of the flag of Scotland in Scottish nationalism. However Scotland has been recognised as a nation within a nation. The flag of Scotland has been officially defined by the Scottish Parliament in 2003 and is flown there and almost universally by Scottish authorities. There is no English legislature; the entire British legislature sits in England and is only subject to very weak conventions on voting on English matters. The flag of England does not figure in legislation, and its use by English nationalists is complex as these divide among those who are far-right as heavily opposed to further immigration and seeking to distinguish between residents in the jobs market and welfare state system such as the British National Party (founded 1982) and the English Defence League (founded 2009) and those who merely seek the level of devolution of Scotland, or Wales. Underscoring this complexity, in January 2012 Simon Hughes, the deputy leader of the Liberal Democrats, supported calls for a devolved English parliament and which continues under such lobbies as the Campaign for an English Parliament, and is occasionally a minor debate subject at all of the major parties' annual conferences.

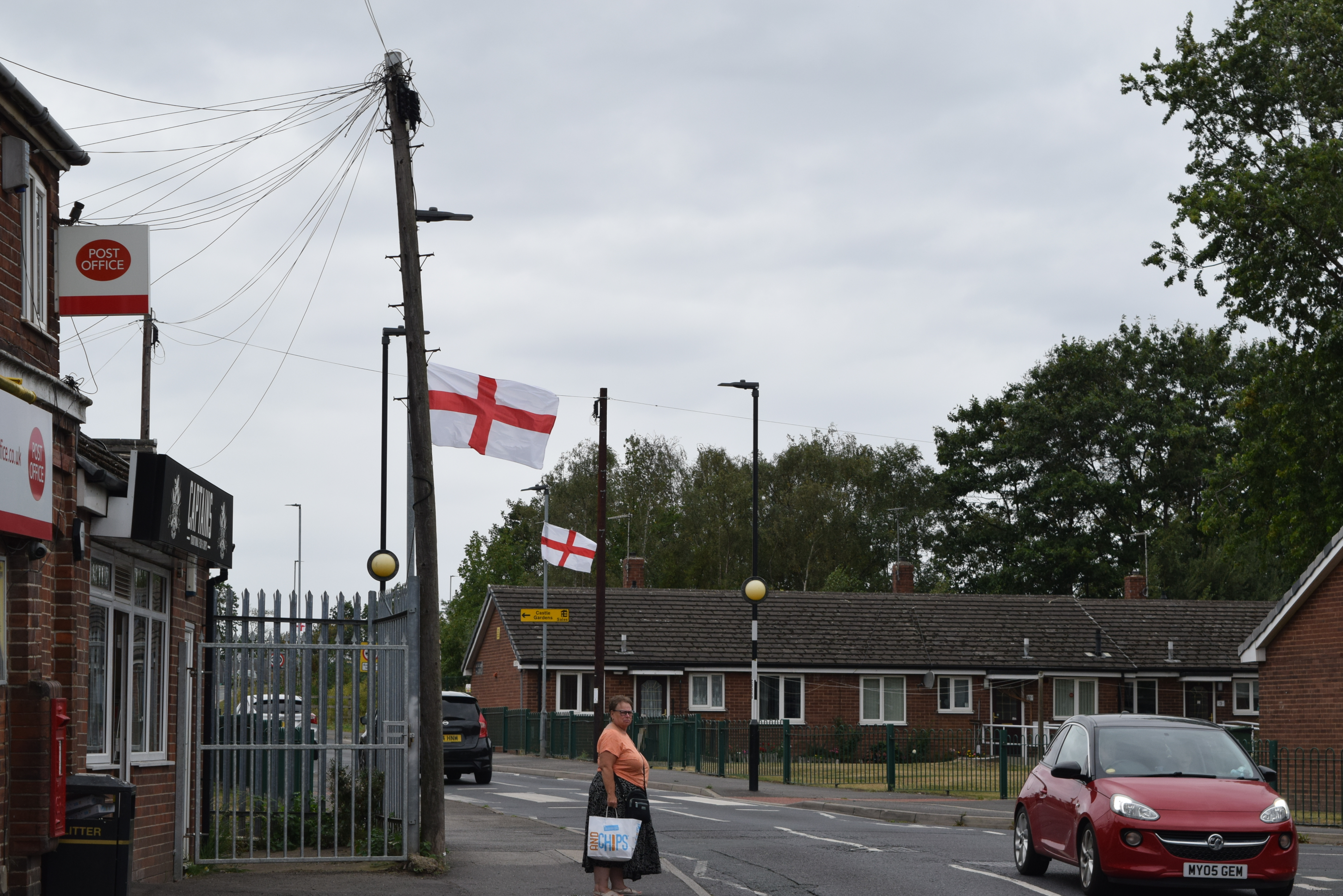
The Flag of England and Union Flag appeared throughout England in late 2025 as part of Operation Raise the Colours.

Since the flag's widespread use in sporting events since the mid-1990s, the association with far-right nationalism has waned, and the flag is now frequently flown throughout the country both privately and by local authorities.

In September 2025, the England flag and the Union Jack became increasingly visible in the UK, in what was described as a "flag phenomenon". The first major display occurred in Weoley Castle, a neighbourhood of largely postwar council stock homes, before spreading to other parts of Birmingham in response to the "proliferation" of Palestine flags. The phenomenon drew media attention after local authorities in Birmingham and York ordered the removal of British flags while allowing Palestine flags to remain, prompting public backlash and accusations of political double standards.

== Outside England ==
Due to the spread of the British Empire, the flag of England is currently, and was formerly used on various flags and coats of arms of different countries, states and provinces throughout the territories of the British Empire. St George's Cross is also used as the city flag of some northern Italian cities, such as Bologna, and other countries such as Georgia.

=== Australia ===
Flag of New South Wales

Flag of the governor of New South Wales, Australia

King's Flag for Australia

Queen Elizabeth II's personal Australian flag (1962–2022)

Lower Murray River Flag

Combined Murray River Flag

Flag of Adelaide

Flag of Melbourne

Flag of Perth

Flag of Sydney

Flag of the Anglican Church of Australia

National Colonial Flag for Australia

=== Canada ===
Flag of Alberta

Flag of Manitoba

Flag of Ontario

Flag of Yukon

Flag of Burgeo

Flag of Montreal

Flag of Montreal (1939–2017)

Flag of the Anglican Church of Canada

Flag of the Dominion of Canada (1868–1921)

Flag of the Hudson's Bay Company (1682–1707)

=== Channel Islands ===
Flag of Alderney

Flag of Guernsey

Flag of Guernsey
(1936–1985)

Flag of Herm

Flag of Sark

=== Elsewhere ===
==== Commonly ====
Flag of Fiji

Ulster Banner (Northern Ireland)

Flag of Ascension Island

Flag of the Falkland Islands

Flag of Saint Helena

Flag of the New England Governor's Conference (NEGC)

Flag of Prince George's County, US (local, official uses)

Flag of St. George's, Bermuda

==== Navies ====
Royal Navy White Ensign

Naval Ensign of Jamaica

Naval Ensign of the Bahamas

Naval Ensign of Barbados

Naval Ensign of the Solomon Islands

Naval Ensign of Ghana

Naval Ensign of Grenada

Naval Ensign of Saint Kitts and Nevis

South African Naval Ensign

Naval Ensign of Tonga

Naval Ensign of Trinidad and Tobago

==== Nautical, non-naval ====
Dunkirk Jack for all "little ships" which participated in the evacuation of 1940

Flag of the Portuguese Minister of Navy (1911 to 1974)

Sydney Ferries house flag

==== Rarely ====
Prime Minister of Jamaica

Flag of the Orange Order

Purple Standard, used by the Orange Order

Flag of the Grand Orange Lodge of New Zealand

Flag of the Loyal Orange Institution of Victoria

Flag of the governor of Saint Helena (official, local use)

Flag of the United Tribes of New Zealand

Original flag of the United Tribes of New Zealand

Flag of New England (no official status but figures as a lower-order flag on a few official buildings)

Flag of Trinity College Dublin

==== Historically ====
Flag of the East India Company (1600–1707)

Pirate flag of Jeremiah Cocklyn

Pirate flag of Bartholomew Roberts

Unofficial British Empire flag (1910–?)

Naval ensign of India (1950–2001)

Naval ensign of India (2004–2014)

Naval ensign of India (2014–2022)

Colonial flag of Jamaica

Former flag of the governor of Northern Ireland

Flag of the Loyalist Volunteer Force (legally declared a terrorist group and moribund/very low-level presence from 2000)

Flag of the Commissioners of Irish Lights (pre–1970)

House flag of the British and Irish Steam Packet Company (B&I) dissolved 1992

House flag of the City of Cork Steam Packet Company (dissolved 1969)

House flag of the Cork Steamship Company (dissolved 1918)

House flag of the Limerick Steamship Company (dissolved 1970)

House flag of the Waterford Steamship Company (dissolved 1912)

Municipal flag of Prince George's County (1696–1963)

Queen Elizabeth II's personal Jamaican flag (1966–2022)

== In Unicode ==
Twemoji typeface Flag of England, (as per X)

In 2017, the Unicode Consortium approved emoji support for the flag of England, alongside the flags of Scotland and Wales, in Unicode version 10.0 and Emoji version 5.0. This was following a proposal from Jeremy Burge of Emojipedia and Owen Williams of BBC Wales in March 2016, The flag is implemented using the regional indicator symbol sequence GB-ENG. Prior to this update, The Daily Telegraph reported that users had "been able to send emojis of the Union Flag, but not of the individual nations".

== See also ==
- Royal Banner of England
- Royal coat of arms of England
- List of English flags
- List of British flags
- Saint Patrick's Flag
- Tudor Rose
- Flags of Europe
- Flags of the English Interregnum
- St George's Day in England
- Flag of Georgia (country)
- Operation Raise the Colours
