= English national identity =

Flag of England

Royal arms of England

English national identity is the collective identity, culture, history, ancestry and language that is expressed by the English people in England and in the larger diaspora overseas. The nature of English national identity has been contested in public and academic debate in the 21st century as the country has undergone profound demographic and social changes.

According to some scholars, a national identity of the English as the people or ethnic group dominant in England can be traced to the Anglo-Saxon period. For Lindy Brady and Marc Morris, Bede's Ecclesiastical History of the English People and the construction of Offa's Dyke demonstrate early English identity as early as AD 731, and the unification of the Kingdom of England in the ninth and tenth centuries establish it as a national identity. They make the argument that, after the Norman Conquest, in the thirteenth century (and possibly earlier), this identity was codified into law, when Anglo-Saxons were given second-class citizen status as Englishry. Similarly, Adrian Hastings considers England to be the oldest example of a "mature nation", and links the development of this nationhood to the Christian Church and spread of written popular languages to existing ethnic groups.

In contrast, John Breuilly rejects the notion these examples constituted "national" identity and criticizes the assumption that continued usage of a term such as 'English' means continuity in its meaning. Patrick J. Geary agrees, arguing names were adapted to different circumstances by different powers and could convince people of continuity, even if radical discontinuity was the lived reality. Geary also rejects the conflation of early medieval and contemporary group identities as a myth, arguing it is a mistake to conclude continuity based on the recurrence of names and that historians fail to recognize the differences between earlier ways of perceiving group identities and more contemporary attitudes, stating they are "trapped in the very historical process we are attempting to study". Krishan Kumar also points out that Bede's 'English' did not refer to a unified people, but rather "still diverse groups of Angles, Saxons, Jutes and others with distinct ethnicities".

Some English people think of the terms 'English' and 'British' as interchangeable. This is not the case for the other British countries. While the official United Kingdom census does record self-identified ethnic groups, the "English" label is only available in the form of English/Welsh/Scottish/Northern Irish/British under the "White" heading (the other tick-boxes under this heading are: Irish, Gypsy or Irish traveller, and "Any other White background").

== Features ==
English identity emerged from the Anglo-Saxon period after the fall of Roman Britain, with the unification of various kingdoms under figures like Alfred the Great in the 9th century. The Norman Conquest in 1066 layered Norman influences onto this Germanic base, shaping the language, governance, and culture. Over centuries, events like Magna Carta (1215), the English Reformation (16th century), and the Industrial Revolution (18th-19th centuries) fostered a narrative of individualism, parliamentary democracy, and innovation as hallmarks of Englishness. Although Englishness and Britishness are used synonymously in some contexts, the two terms are not identical, and the relation of each to the other is complex. Englishness is often a response to different national identities within Britain, such as Scottishness, Irishness, Welshness and Cornishness.

Culturally, English identity is often linked to symbols and traditions: the English language (a global lingua franca), tea-drinking, pub culture, Shakespeare, a dry sense of humour, queuing etiquette, cream teas, and sports like cricket, football and rugby. Though they are British institutions, the monarchy and the BBC are often tied to English identity owing to their geographic bases in England. The countryside with its rolling hills, villages, and pubs also plays a big role in the romanticised self-image, contrasting with urban centres like London, a global melting pot. Socially, English identity is tied to values like "fair play," politeness, understatement, stoicism (the "stiff upper lip"), and parliamentary democracy. Events like the Last Night of the Proms or Guy Fawkes Night also contribute to a shared cultural fabric, though they are not unique to England.

Sometimes Englishness is thought to be encapsulated in terms of a particular relation to sport: fair play, for instance. Arguably, England's "national games" are football and, particularly, cricket. As cricket historian Dominic Malcolm argues, the link between cricket and England's national identity became solidified through literature. Works such as James Love's Cricket: an heroic poem and Mary Mitford's Our Village, along with Nyren's The Cricketers of My Time and Pycroft's The Cricket Field, purported to identify the characteristics of cricket with the notional characteristics of English society, such as pragmatism, integrity, and independence.

English identity has shifted significantly in recent centuries. The British Empire’s peak saw Englishness intertwined with imperial pride, but its decline after World War II prompted a reevaluation. England’s population is diverse, with immigration from former colonies, Europe, and beyond reshaping urban centres like London, Manchester, and Liverpool. This has led to tensions and discussions about what "Englishness" means in a globalised, multiethnic society. Some associate it with rural nostalgia while others see it as urban, dynamic, and cosmopolitan.

== Studies ==
=== Census ===
The UK census began including questions regarding national identity in 2011. The question on the census, in the section on "National identity, ethnic group, language and religion", was the following:

How would you describe your national identity?

Tick all that apply

- English
- Welsh
- Scottish
- Northern Irish
- British
- Other

The 2021 census saw a decline in English people identifying as "English" and a rise in English people identifying as "British" from the 2011 census. Though various potential reasons for this were raised, such as the effects of Brexit in the interim, the Office for National Statistics largely attributed the effect to the answers being shuffled - British was raised to the top of the list.

=== Other surveys ===
The National Centre for Social Research, a British independent social research institute stated in 2024 that the idea of British ancestry was becoming less tied to place of birth.

In 2018, the BBC conducted a survey to interrogate the public's English identity. They found that 80% people living in England identify "strongly" as English, and 82% strongly identify as British.

Though they found that those identifying as English was largely consistent among age groups, the amount of pride people held in that identity varied. 45% of younger people responded that they were proud of their English identity, as opposed to 72% of older people.

== See also ==
- Culture of England
- English nationalism
