= T. P. Bragg =

British musician and writer

Timothy Patrick Bragg (also known as Tim Bragg) is an English author and musician who has worked in politics. He was a founder member of the cultural publication Steadfast. He has been a vegetarian since late childhood. Currently he is perhaps best known as being a drummer/percussionist and flute player.

A singer and songwriter as well as multi-instrumentalist, Bragg's discography includes Fields of England (a CD of 12 revamped and new songs and a digital only five song EP: Fields of England - The Green EP, 2014), Night Ferry (ambient/jazz album featuring flute, 2008), Where is the Fighter? - Songs for Phil Lynott (2009), Stranger Through The Window (2010), Revamped 1 (2011), Revamped Too (2012), Beat Bones & Alchemy (EP 2014), Revamped 3 (2014) Beat Bones & Stone Angels (2016) Been Before (2018) and under Tim Bragg & The Other Side the ambient/dance/electro album, Crossing Over (2013) featuring flute and the EWI (Electric Wind Instrument) and The Way of the Film (2016) ambient/jazz/new age also featuring flute - inspired by an original composition for the short film: Basket Case. The album Authentic co-written with German guitarist Ulrich Hänig was released in the Autumn of 2016. The album Tall Stories on Short Street (co-written with Ross Hemsworth) was released on 31 July 2020. The album Soul on Fire was released on March 30, 2021. The album Project 21 was released late November 2021. Bragg's latest release, Lark Mission, is a concept album about a spacecraft Lark leaving Earth. The album has been co-written with Ismet Mustafic. It was released early January 2023. It has been described as both a progressive rock album and as a mix of the former and a film soundtrack, given the songs themes and overall narrative.

He stood as a paper-candidate for the English Democrats Party in the 2004 European Parliament election. He was a member of the English Democrats for a year; he is not and has not been a member of any political party before or since. Bragg is now spokesman for (and founder of) the environmental campaign group English Green. The ethos of English Green is given as: English Green is a group interested in ecology and its relationship with all aspects of human activity. How we co-exist with the flora and fauna and how we conduct ourselves in an ecologically healthy manner and how we achieve a spiritual and material well-being are of particular interest. As of 2024 English Green is described as a green realist group.

Between 2019 and 2022 a number of songs from Beat Bones & Stone Angels charted on the Greek Blues Chart - including the instrumental track Bluesy Blues reaching #2.

Bragg read English and American Literature at Warwick University, graduating with a 2:1 (Hons).

== Books ==
- The English Dragon (2001)
- A Declaration and Philosophy of Progressive Nationalism (With Graham Williamson, 2005)
- Biting Tongues (2005)
- The White Rooms (2005)
- Oak (2006)
- Counter Culture Anthology (Editor, 2006)
- HEAD: And Other Dark Tales (2017 - Kindle Edition)
- Lyrics To Live By: Keys to Self Help - Notes for a Better Life (2018)
- LYRICS TO LIVE BY 2: Further Reflections, Meditations & Life Lessons (2020)
- A Conversation of Trees (2020)
- HEAD And Other Dark Tales (2023) Revised Edition, paperback.
- The Mirror (2023)
- The Experience (2026)

== Film ==
- Hounds of Rampur - film script co-writer (with Chandran Tattvaraj) and music to be featured in film. See external links: Hounds of Rampur (Production set to begin early 2019.)

Tim Bragg: 'We have a full production team beginning to work on the film. It's taken time - a lot longer than we envisaged - such is the way of the (film) world. Everyone is feeling very upbeat about this project.'
