= Campaign for an English Parliament =

English pressure group

- Flag
- Founded: 23 September 1998
- Founder: Harry Bottom, Terry Brown, Guy Green, Pearl Linsell, Tony Linsell and Cyning Meadowcroft
- Type: Company limited by guarantee
- Registration no.: 03636739
- Purpose: English politics
- Region served: England
- Key people: Steve Davis, Chairman; Eddie Bone, Campaign Director
- Website: thecep.org.uk

The Campaign for an English Parliament (CEP) is a pressure group which seeks the establishment of a devolved English parliament. The CEP is the main organisation associated with an English Parliament. It was formed as a non-denominational lobbying group. It is a single-issue campaign, seeking to stand apart from English nationalist currents, and proclaiming its commitment to a civic, rather than ethnic, conception of the English nation.

== Establishment ==
It was set up in 1998 by six founder-members: Harry Bottom, Terry Brown, Guy Green, Pearl Linsell, Tony Linsell, and Cyning Meadowcroft. This was in response to the Devolution acts of that year, which they believed would put the English at a serious political and constitutional disadvantage.

They determined that the CEP would represent all of the people of England, whatever their ethnicity or how they chose to identify themselves, who were legitimately living in England and paying taxes to the UK government.

The first meeting took place in London in June 1998, and members leafleted the three main political parties (Labour, Liberal Democrat, and Conservative) at their conferences in the autumn of that year. The campaign was incorporated as a not-for-profit company in September 1998 and is not affiliated to any political party. The CEP have on their National Council members and ex-members of the Labour, Liberal Democrats, United Kingdom Independence Party (UKIP), English Democrats, and Conservative parties.

== History ==
The quarterly members' newsletter, "Think of England", was started in summer 1999 and, in June 2000, about 50 members lobbied their MPs at the Houses of Parliament. In the autumn of 2003, the CEP mounted a "Parliament or Partition" conference in London which was attended by about 300 people and was addressed by Simon Hughes, MP, and UKIP's Nigel Farage. The "Parliament or Partition" conference was in response to the government's intention to hold referendums on devolution to Regional Assemblies. The CEP opposed this on a number of grounds but principally because they believed it would have destroyed the traditional political unity of England as a country, ended the shire system of local government, and withdrawn power from the English local authorities.

In 2004, the CEP participated in the English Constitutional Convention, a project which members hoped would encourage debate on the way that England should be governed.

2008 saw the CEP's second major conference "The Future of England", addressed by Simon Lee, Simon Hughes, MP (who stood in for Frank Field at the last minute), and Canon Kenyon Wright, convener of the Scottish Constitutional Convention.

In 2009, the CEP co-sponsored a debate at the Convention on Modern Liberty involving Yasmin Alibhai-Brown, Paul Kingsnorth, Gerry Hassan, and Gareth Young.

In June 2010, the CEP controversially made a complaint to Fife Police about music store HMV's "Anyone but England" promotion during the World Cup. A CEP spokesperson explained that the group's motivation was a desire to avoid the sort of Anglophobic violence that marred the 2006 World Cup.

Over the years, the CEP have held four meetings in the House of Commons (HoC), they have had letters and articles published in many different media, and they have appeared on radio and television. Members have addressed schools, political associations, and party conferences. They have produced booklets – leafleted to the public in town centres, at county shows, and at sporting events – and papers, some of which were sent to every Member of Parliament. Peer Mike Knowles, the CEP's former chairman, has appeared before the HoC Justice Committee.

== See also ==
- Civic nationalism
- English nationalism
- Parliament of England
- Politics of England
- Regional assembly (England)
- St George's Day in England
- Acts of Union 1707
- West Lothian question
