= Flag of Great Britain =

Flag of the Kingdom of Great Britain (1707-1801)

Great Britain
- King's Colour
- Use: Civil and state flag
- Proportion: 3:5
- Adopted: 1606 (Royal decree); 1707 (National flag)
- Relinquished: 1801
- Design: Four stripes of white, (horizontal, vertical and two diagonal) on a blue field, with a central red cross; all extend to edge
- Red Ensign of Great Britain
- Use: Civil and naval ensign
- Design: A red field with the flag of Great Britain in the canton
- Blue Ensign of Great Britain
- Use: Civil and naval ensign
- Design: A blue field with the flag of Great Britain in the canton
- White Ensign of Great Britain
- Use: Naval ensign
- Design: A cross of St George with the flag of Great Britain in the canton

The flag of Great Britain, often referred to as the King's Colour, Union Flag, Union Jack, and British flag (retroactively prefixed as being the "first" such flag, in order to distinguish it from the modern flag of the United Kingdom), was used at sea from 1606 then more generally from 1707 until 1801 as the flag of the Kingdom of Great Britain, and is the precursor to the modern Union Jack.

Set down in 1606 by Royal decree of James VI and I, the flag's form combined the flag of the Kingdom of England and flag of the Kingdom of Scotland and was specifically intended for maritime use by vessels of both kingdoms, which since 1603 had shared a single monarch in a personal union following the Union of the Crowns. In 1634, Charles I proclaimed that the flag's use be restricted to vessels of the Navy Royal and Royal Scots Navy, stating that it "be reserved as an ornament proper for Our own Ships and Ships in our immediate Service and Pay, and none other".

The flag was subsequently adopted as the national flag of the unified Kingdom of Great Britain, following the Acts of Union 1707; gaining the status of "the Ensign armorial of the Kingdom of Great Britain". It was later adopted by land forces; however, the shade of blue of land-based versions appears on contemporary works of art to have been lighter than those intended for maritime use; darker dyes being used at sea for durability.

The flag of Great Britain consists of two Christian crosses; the flag consists of the red cross of Saint George, patron saint of England, superimposed on the white saltire of Saint Andrew, patron saint of Scotland. Its correct proportions are 3:5. The blue field on the flag was sky blue at first; however, over time darker shades of blue were employed to counter the effects of weathering at sea.

With few exceptions, the flag's official use came to an end in 1801, following the Acts of Union 1800 and the creation of the United Kingdom of Great Britain and Ireland whereby the Saint Patrick's Cross, representing the Kingdom of Ireland, was added to the flag of Great Britain to create the flag of the United Kingdom.

== Creation ==
=== Proposed versions ===
In the wake of the personal union between England and Scotland resulting from the Union of the Crowns in 1603, King James instructed his Heralds to draw up designs for a new flag, juxtaposing the St George's Cross and the St Andrew's Saltire:

Early (c. 1604) design proposals for the Union Jack (manuscript in the National Library of Scotland)

However, none were acceptable to James, who in 1606 selected the design whereby the cross of Saint George was seen to surmount that of Saint Andrew.

By James VI and I, Orders in Council, 1606:

By the King: Whereas, some differences hath arisen between Our subjects of South and North Britaine travelling by Seas, about the bearing of their Flagges: For the avoiding of all contentions hereafter. We have, with the advice of our Council, ordered: That from henceforth all our Subjects of this Isle and Kingdome of Great Britaine, and all our members thereof, shall beare in their main-toppe the Red Crosse, commonly called St. George's Crosse, and the White Crosse, commonly called St. Andrew's Crosse, joyned together according to the forme made by our heralds, and sent by Us to our Admerall to be published to our Subjects: and in their fore-toppe our Subjects of South Britaine shall weare the Red Crosse onely as they were wont, and our Subjects of North Britaine in their fore-toppe the White Crosse onely as they were accustomed.

The flag of England; ”the Red Crosse, commonly called St. George’s Crosse”

The flag of Scotland; ”the White Crosse, commonly called St. Andrew’s Crosse”

Form of conjoined flag approved by King James VI and I in 1606

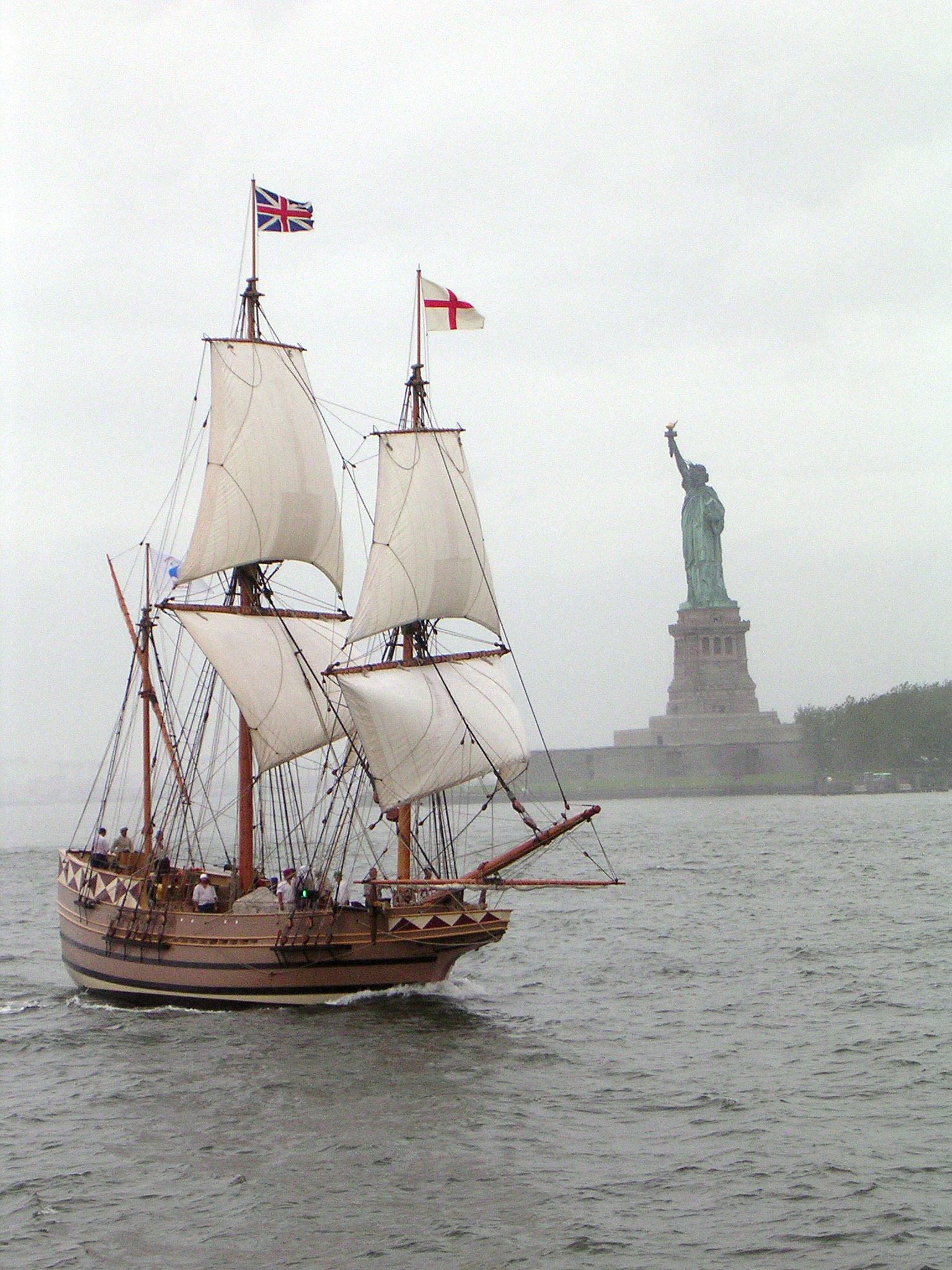
Replica of early 17th century English ship Godspeed, with Union flag in her “main-toppe” and that of England in her “fore-toppe”

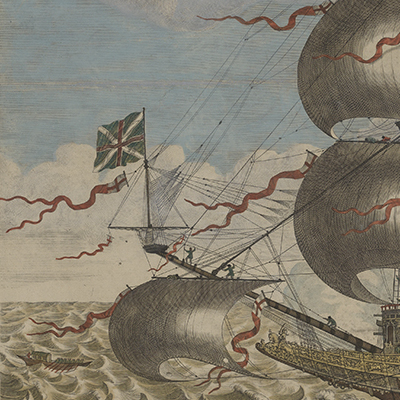
England's Navy Royal warship HMS Sovereign of the Seas, with Union Jack on her jackstaff, c. 1637, as per the 1634 proclamation of Charles I

=== Scottish variant ===
In objecting to the design of Union Flag favoured by James, a number of owners and masters of merchant vessels in the Kingdom of Scotland raised the issue with John Erskine, 19th Earl of Mar, and were encouraged by him to send a letter of complaint to James VI, via the Privy Council of Scotland, which stated:

Most sacred Soverayne. A greate nomber of the maisteris and awnaris of the schippis of this your Majesteis kingdome hes verie havelie compleint to your Majesteis Counsell that the form and patrone of the flaggis of schippis, send doun heir and commandit to be ressavit and used be the subjectis of boith kingdomes, is very prejudiciall to the fredome and dignitie of this Estate and will gif occasioun of reprotche to this natioun quhairevir the said flage sal happin to be worne beyond sea becaus, as your sacred majestie may persave, the Scottis Croce, callit Sanctandrois Croce is twyse divydit, and the Inglishe Croce, callit Sanct George, haldin haill and drawne through the Scottis Croce, whiche is thairby obscurit and no takin nor merk to be seen of the Scottis Armes. This will breid some heit and miscontentment betwix your Majesteis subjectis, and it is to be ferit that some inconvenientis sall fall out betwix thame, for oure seyfairing men cannot be inducit to ressave that flag as it is set doun. They haif drawne two new drauchtis and patronis as most indifferent for boith kingdomes which they present to the Counsell, and craved our approbatioun of the same; bot we haif reserved that to you Majesteis princelie determination.

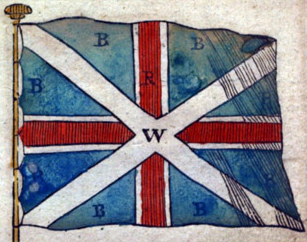
Scots Union Flag shown in The Present State of the Universe. (1704)

Although documents accompanying this complaint which contained drafts for alternative designs have been lost, evidence exists, at least on paper, of an unofficial Scottish variant, whereby the Scottish cross was uppermost. There is reason to think that cloth flags of this design were employed during the 17th century for unofficial use on Scottish vessels at sea.

This flag's design is also described and appears on a colour plate in the 1704 edition of The Present State of the Universe by John Beaumont, which contains as an appendix The Ensigns, Colours or Flags of the Ships at Sea: Belonging to The several Princes and States in the World.

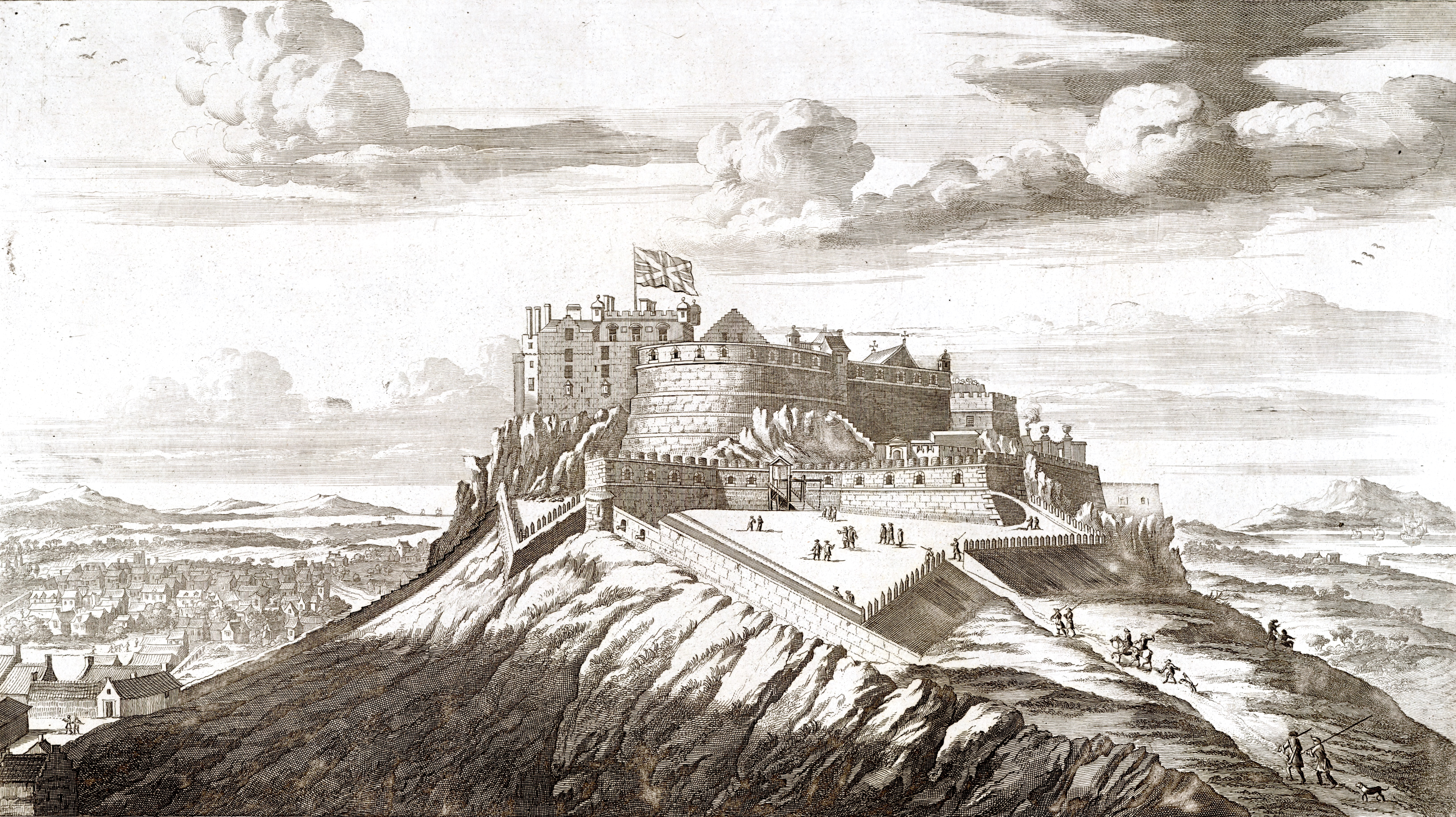
Slezer's Edinburgh Castle c. 1693 depicting the Scottish Union flag

On land, evidence confirming the use of this flag appears in the depiction of Edinburgh Castle by John Slezer, in his series of engravings entitled Theatrum Scotiae, c. 1693. Appearing in later editions of Theatrum Scotiae, the North East View of Edinburgh Castle engraving depicts the Scotch (to use the appropriate adjective of that period) version of the Union Flag flying from the Palace block of the Castle. On The North Prospect of the City of Edenburgh engraving, the flag shown is indistinct.

A manuscript compiled in 1785 by William Fox and in possession of the Flag Research Center includes a full plate showing "the scoth [sic] union" flag. This could imply that there was still some use of a Scottish variant before the addition of the cross of St Patrick to the Union Flag in 1801.

Another early proposal for the Union Jack, consisting of a white St Andrew's saltire with blue fimbriation superimposed over a red St George's cross on a field of white.

A reconstruction of an alternative version of the Union Jack that appears on a painted wooden ceiling boss from Linlithgow Palace (c. 1617).

=== 1707 Kingdom of Great Britain ===
Following the Union of the Crowns in 1603, King James developed the habit of referring to a "Kingdom of Great Britain" and to himself as "King of Great Britain". At his funeral in 1625, the conjoined flag was recorded as the "Banner of the Union of the two Crosses of England and Scotland". However, despite the personal union represented by James and subsequent sovereigns, in practice the Kingdom of England and Kingdom of Scotland continued as separate States, each with its own parliament, laws, currency, religion, etc. for over a century.

James' ambition to rule over a unified Kingdom of Great Britain was finally realised by his great-granddaughter Anne in 1707, with the flag of the new kingdom formally chosen on 17 April 1707, two weeks before the Acts of Union of 1707 were to take effect.

Sir Henry St George, the younger, the Garter Principal King of Arms, having presented several designs of flag to Queen Anne and her Privy Council for consideration, the flag for the soon to be unified Kingdom of Great Britain was chosen. At the suggestion of the Scots representatives, the designs for consideration included that version of Union Jack showing the Cross of Saint Andrew uppermost; identified as being the "Scotts union flagg as said to be used by the Scotts". However, the Queen and her Council approved Sir Henry's original effort, numbered "one".

Cross of Saint Andrew uppermost; "Scotts union flagg as said to be used by the Scotts"

Design Anne and her Privy Council approved; Sir Henry's original effort, numbered "one"

== After 1801 ==
Component crosses of the 1801 Union flag, including the Saint Patrick's Saltire

With the creation of the United Kingdom of Great Britain and Ireland in 1801, the flag of the Kingdom of Great Britain was changed to include the flag of the Kingdom of Ireland; the Saint Patrick's Saltire. Almost all British ensigns and other official designs incorporating the pre-1801 design of flag were altered to reflect the new flag of the United Kingdom, either immediately or once pre-existing stocks were exhausted.

An exception was the Commissioners' Ensign of the Northern Lighthouse Board, whose old stock lasted so long that its anachronistic design became fixed by tradition. The old flag has been included in some later designs to mark a pre-1801 British connection, as with the coat of arms of the Colony of Sierra Leone adopted in 1914 or the flag of Baton Rouge, Louisiana, adopted in 1995. The flag of Somerset County, Maryland, briefly used from 1694, was revived after being rediscovered in 1958. The flag of Taunton, Massachusetts, a reconstruction of an American Revolutionary banner, was officially adopted at the bicentennial of its 1774 introduction; similarly, Westmoreland County, Pennsylvania, in 1973 adopted the 1775 flag of John Proctor's Independent Battalion of Westmoreland County Provincials. The unofficial flag of Lord Howe Island, Australia, also harks to the pre-1801 Union Jack.

The 1707 Union Flag is also the official flag of the United Empire Loyalists Association of Canada. As such, it is often flown by individuals of Loyalist ancestry, and is also included in Loyalists townships, like Niagara-on-the-Lake and Picton, Ontario.

Post-1801 flags incorporating pre-1801 British flag
Commissioners' flag of the Northern Lighthouse Board, United Kingdom

United Empire Loyalists' Association of Canada coat of arms

Flag of Niagara-on-the-Lake, Ontario, Canada

Flag of Picton, Ontario, Canada

Flag of Loyalist, Ontario, Canada

Flag of Bath, Ontario (A community of Loyalist, Ontario), Canada

Flag of Gananoque, ON, Canada

Flag of Amherstburg, ON, Canada

Flag of Taunton, Massachusetts, and Weymouth, New Jersey, United States

Flag of Westmoreland County, Pennsylvania, United States

Flag of Baton Rouge, Louisiana, United States

Flag of Mobile, Alabama, United States

Flag of Somerset County, Maryland, United States. The flag was adopted in 1694, based on the King's Colour from 1606.

== Gallery ==
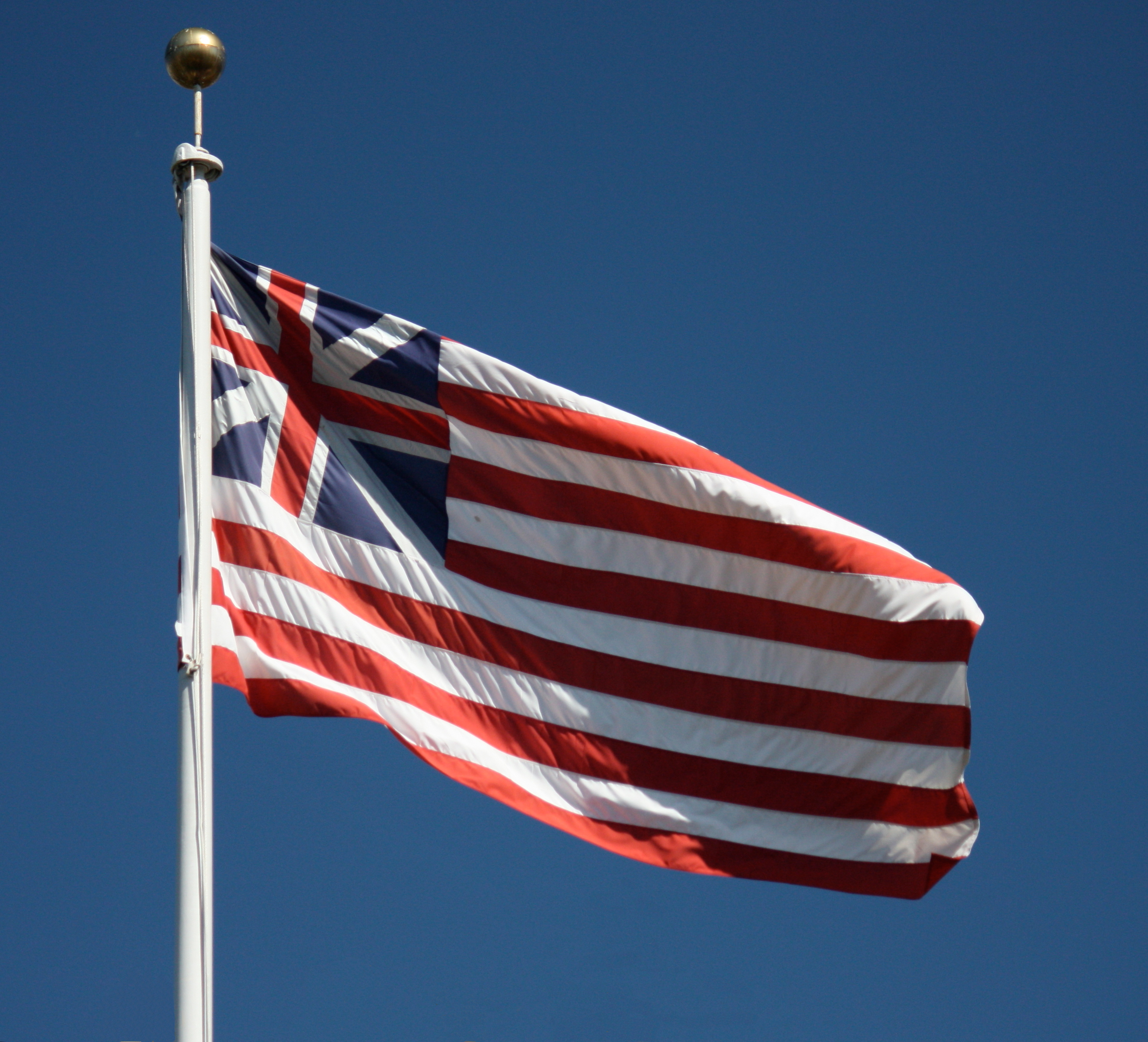
Continental Union Flag, featuring early Union Flag in the canton, outside City Hall, San Francisco

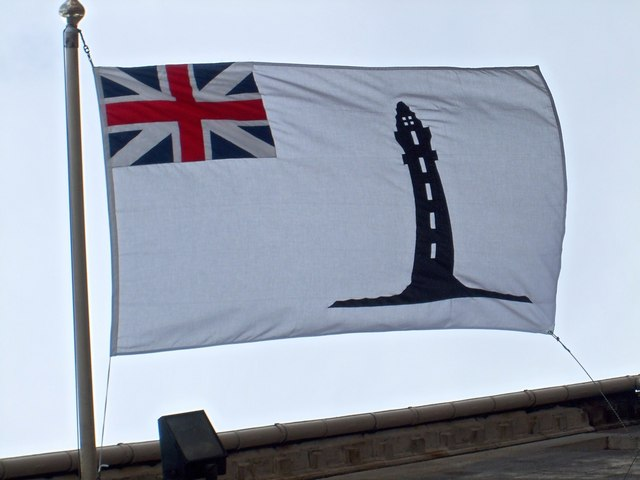
Pre-1801 Union flag on Commissioners’ Ensign of the Northern Lighthouse Board

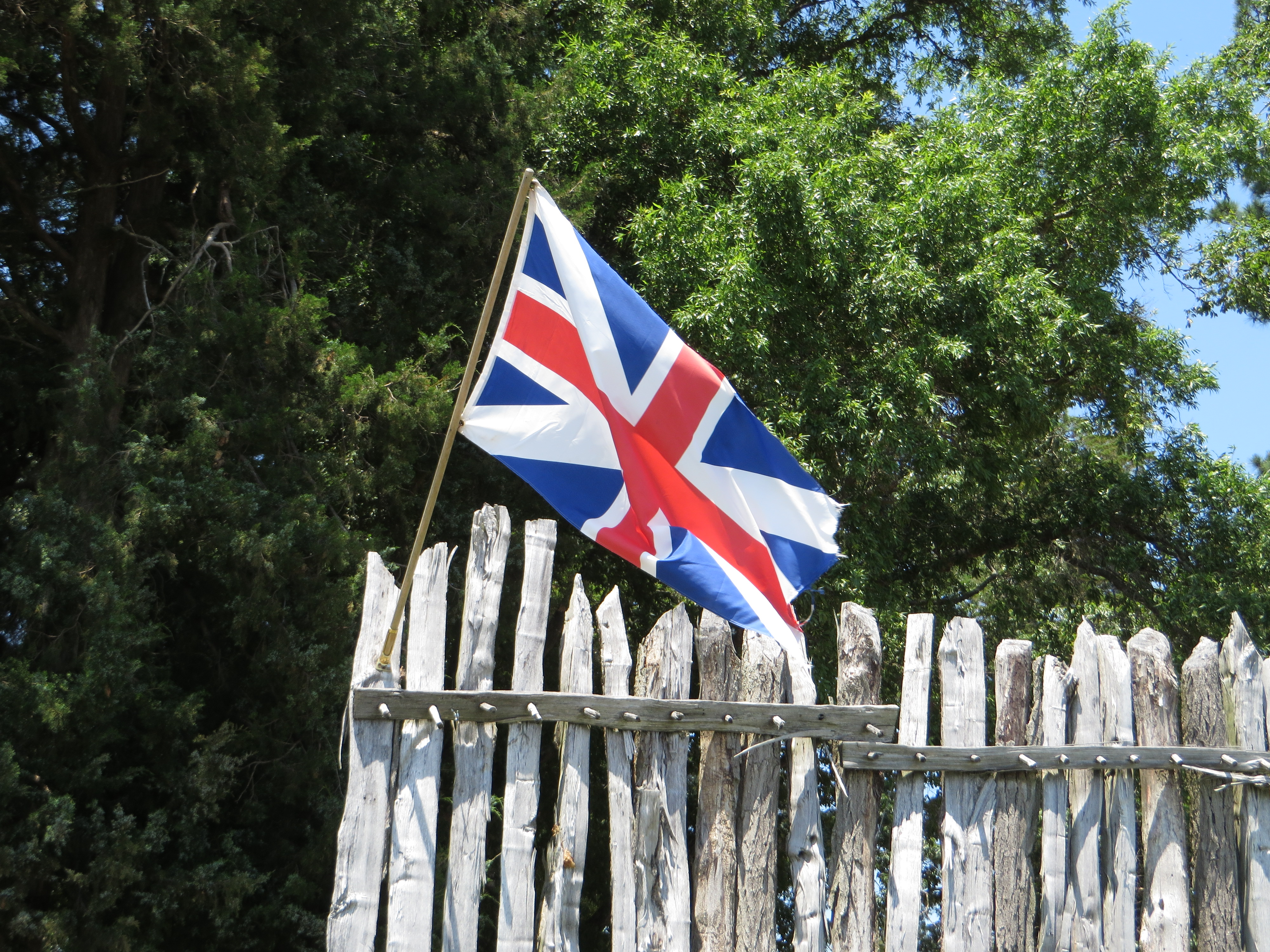
Pre-1801 Union flag at the historic Jamestown Settlement, Virginia

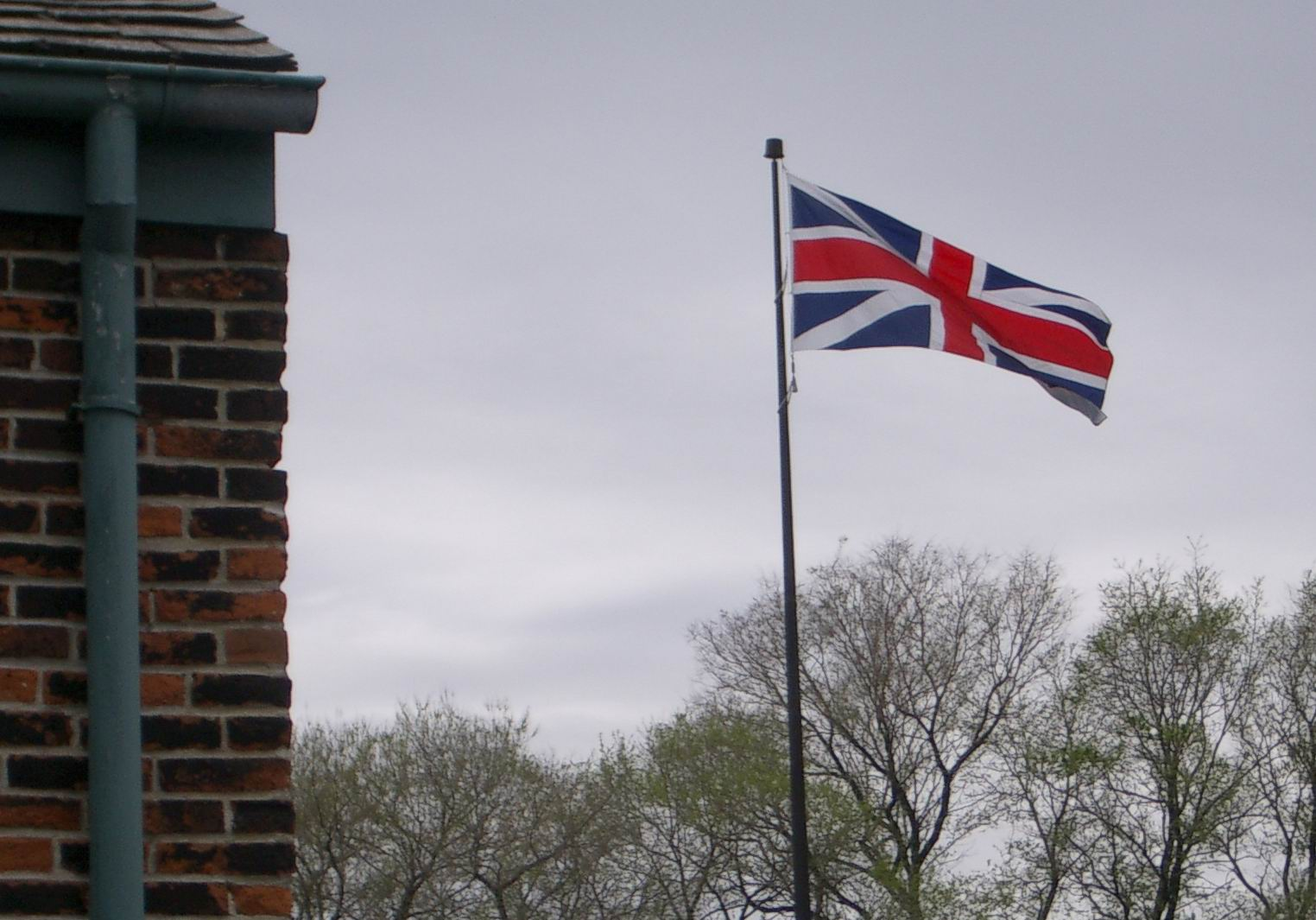
Pre-1801 Union Jack, Fort York, Toronto

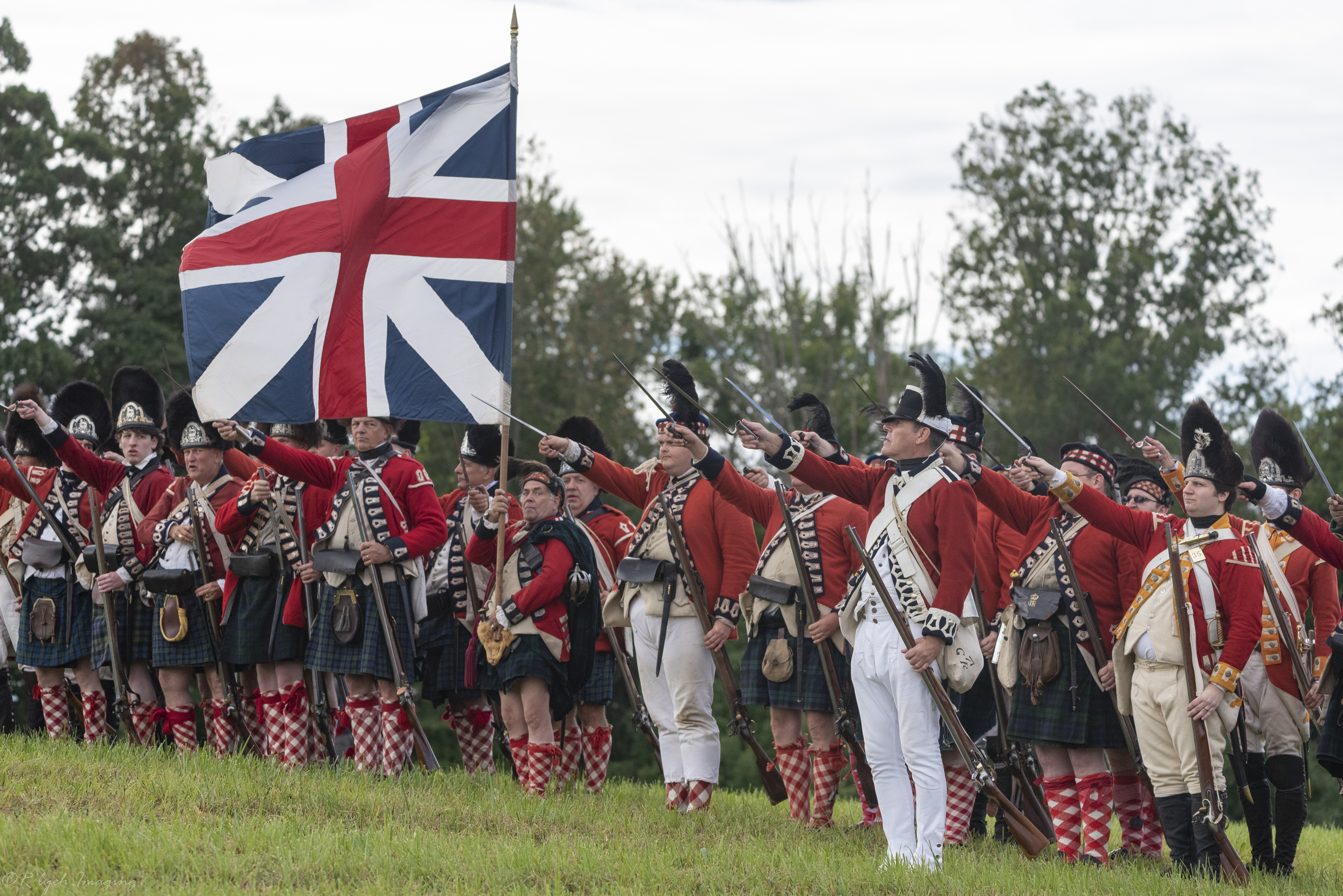
British contingent at a reenactment of the 1777 Battle of Brandywine, Pennsylvania

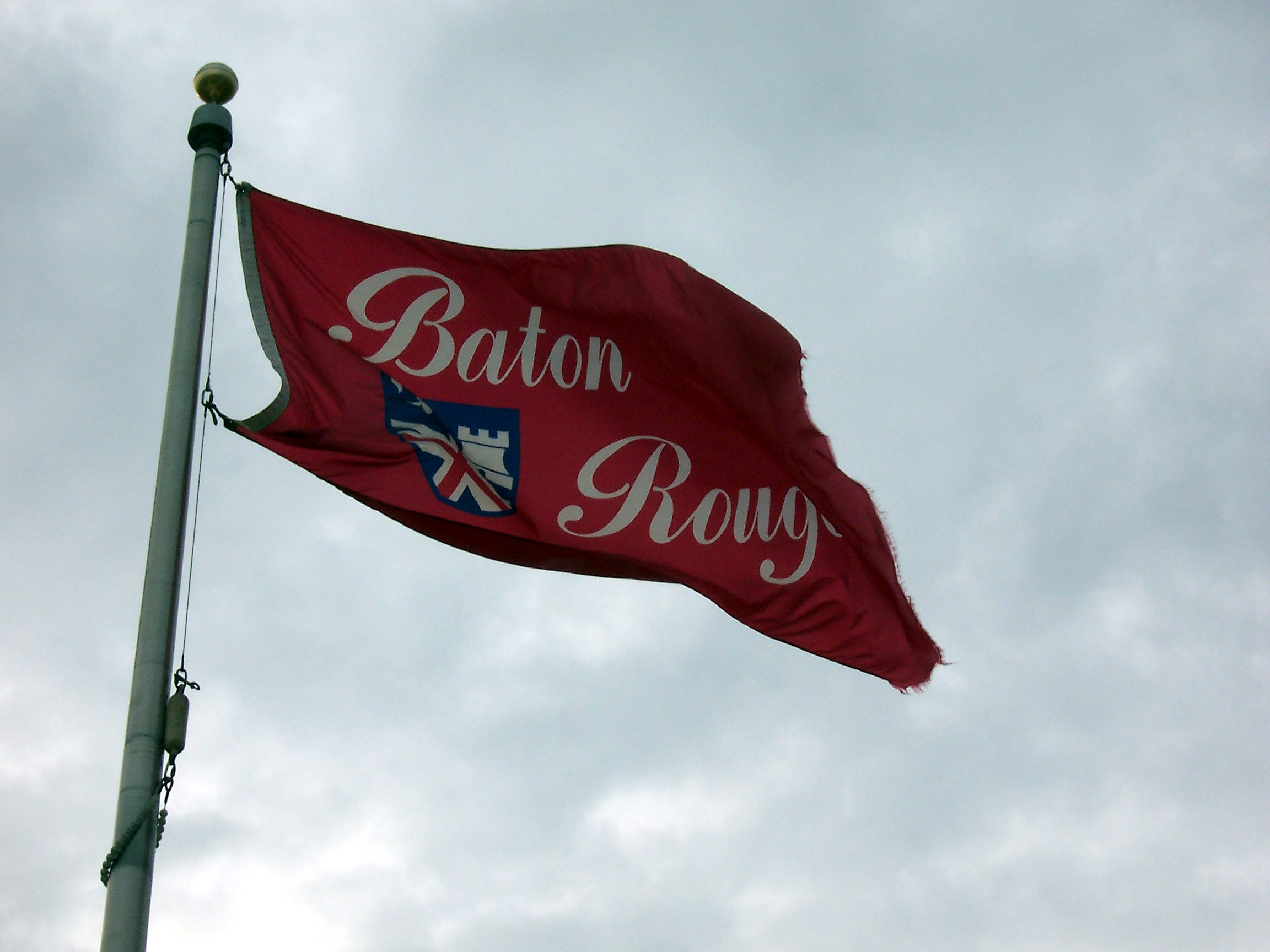
Flag of Baton Rouge, Louisiana

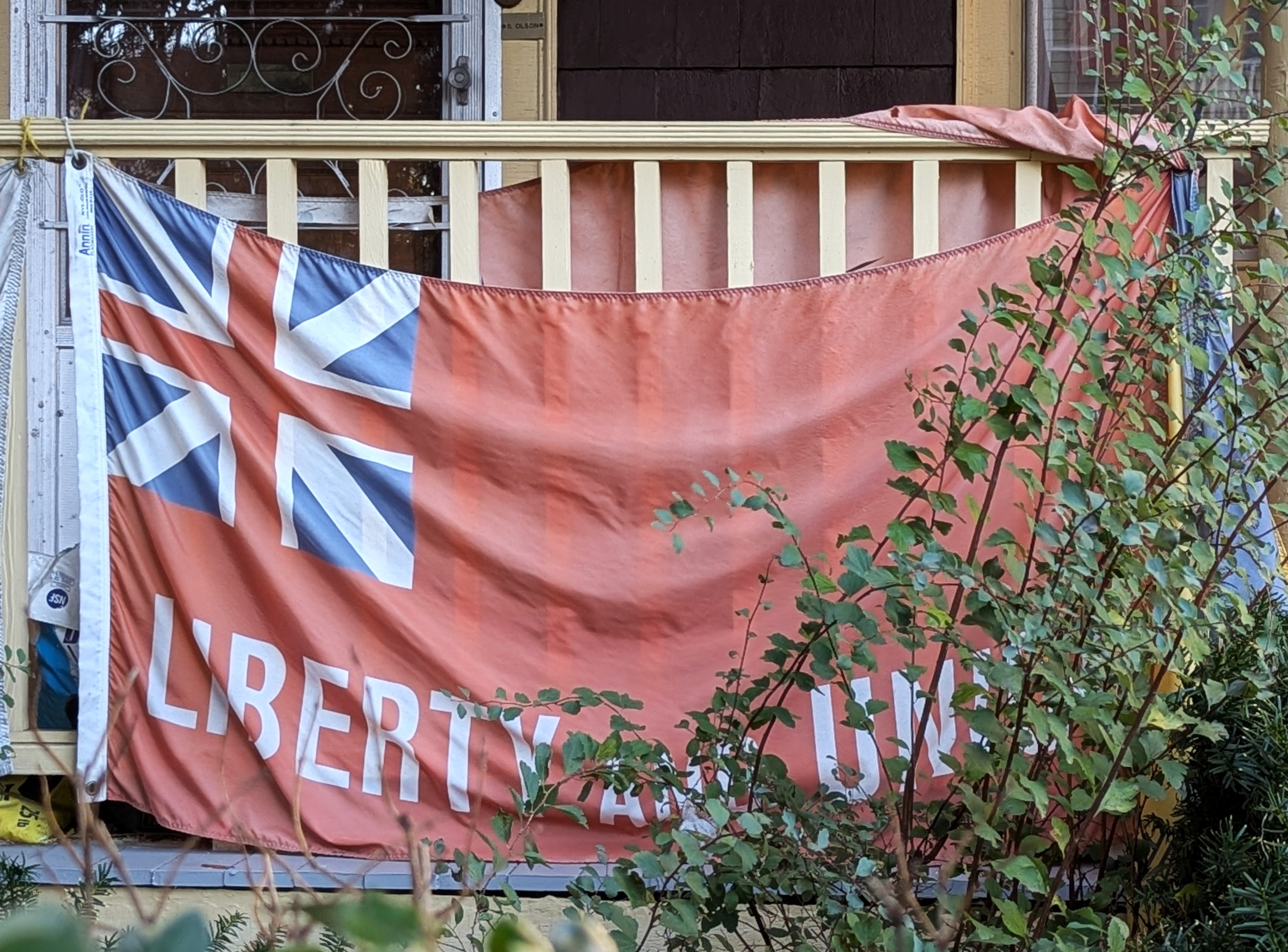
City flag of Taunton, Massachusetts, featuring early Union Flag in the canton

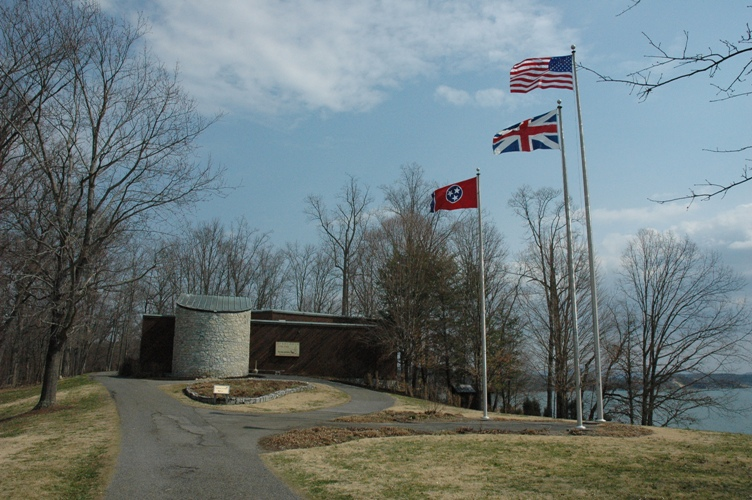
Pre-1801 Union flag, together with the Flag of the United States and Flag of Tennessee, at Fort Loudoun (Tennessee)

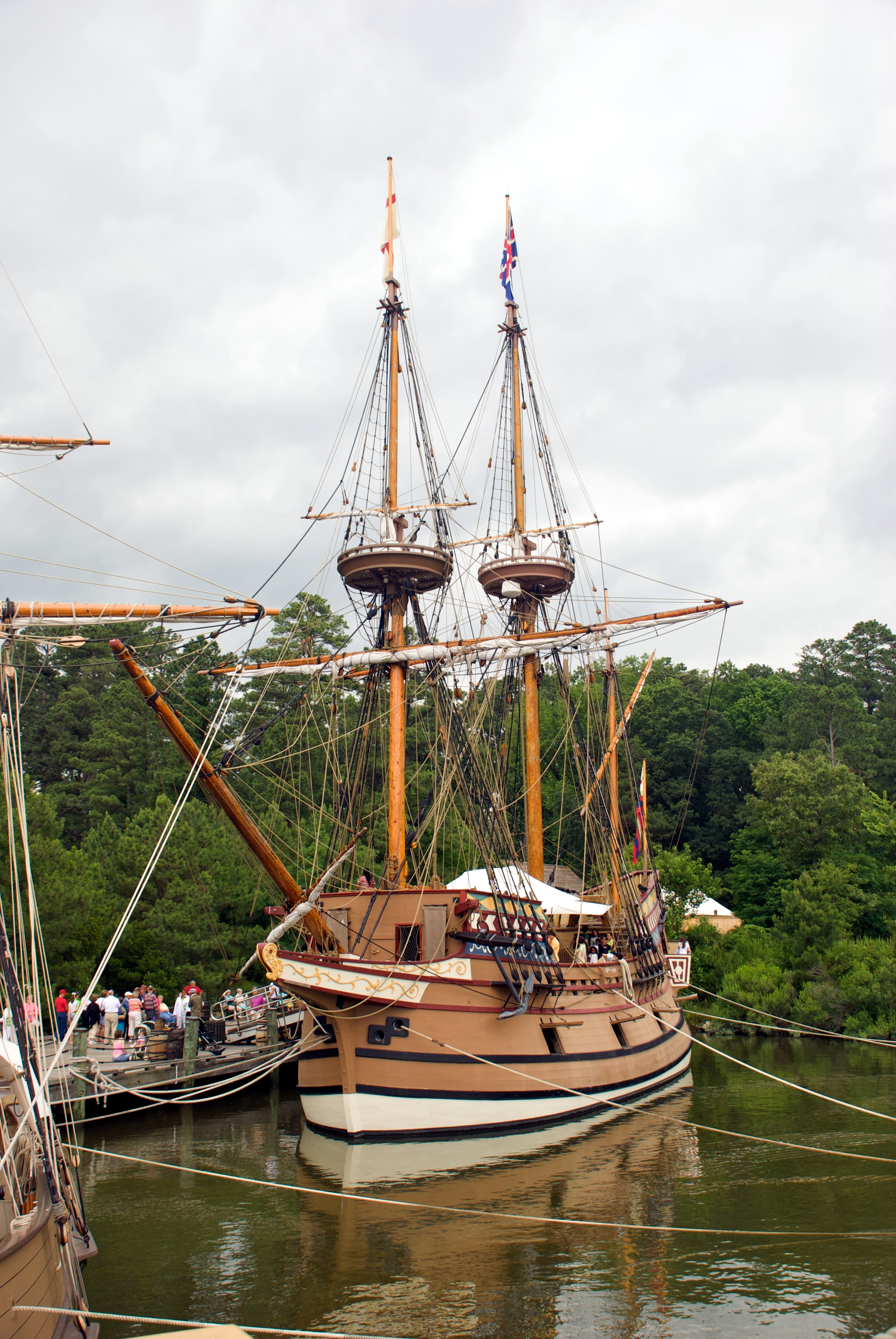
Replica of the 17th century Susan Constant flying a Union flag in the main topmast and flag of England in the fore topmast

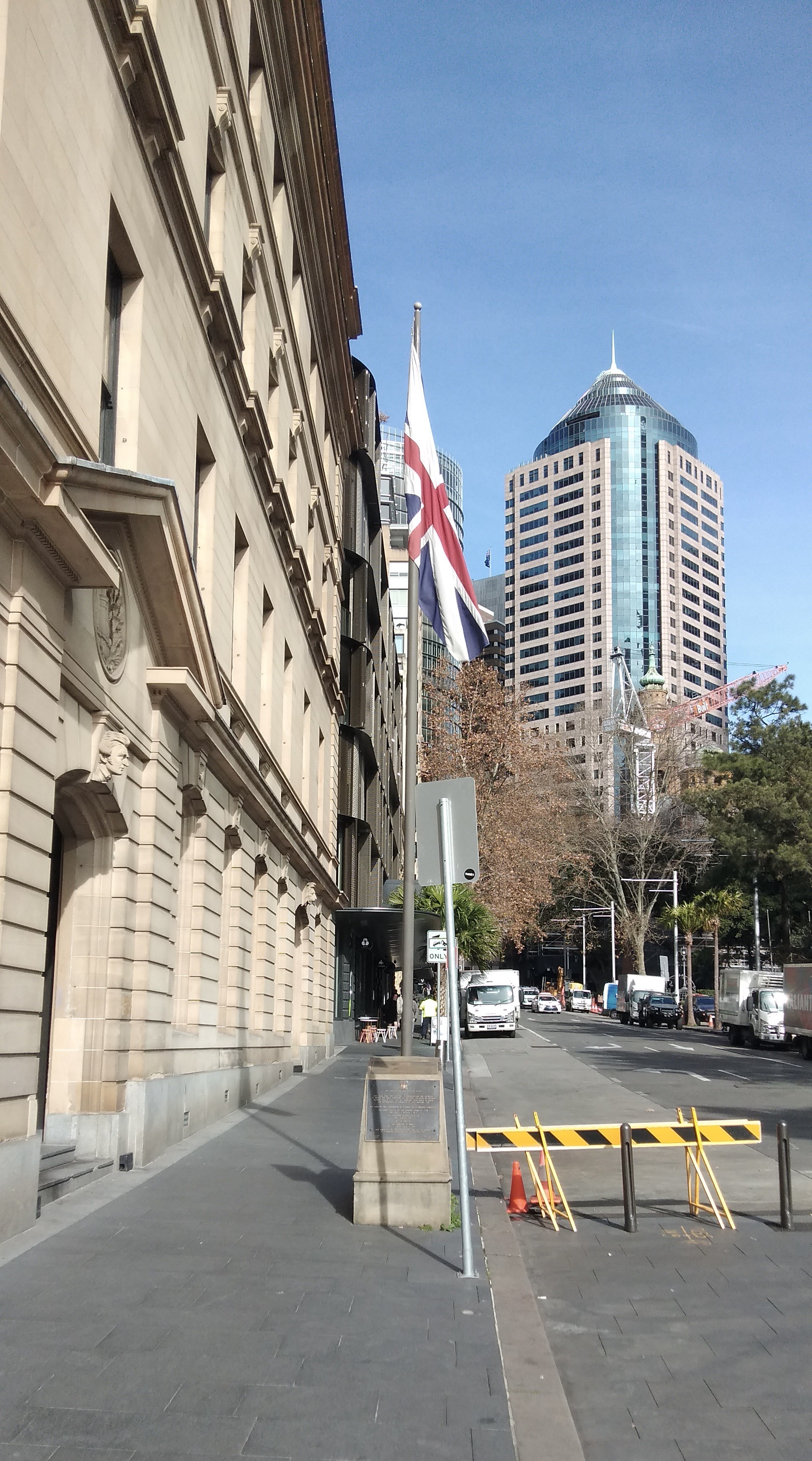
Pre-1801 Union flag at Sydney Cove, where it was raised on 26 January 1788, a date in Australian history now marked as Australia Day

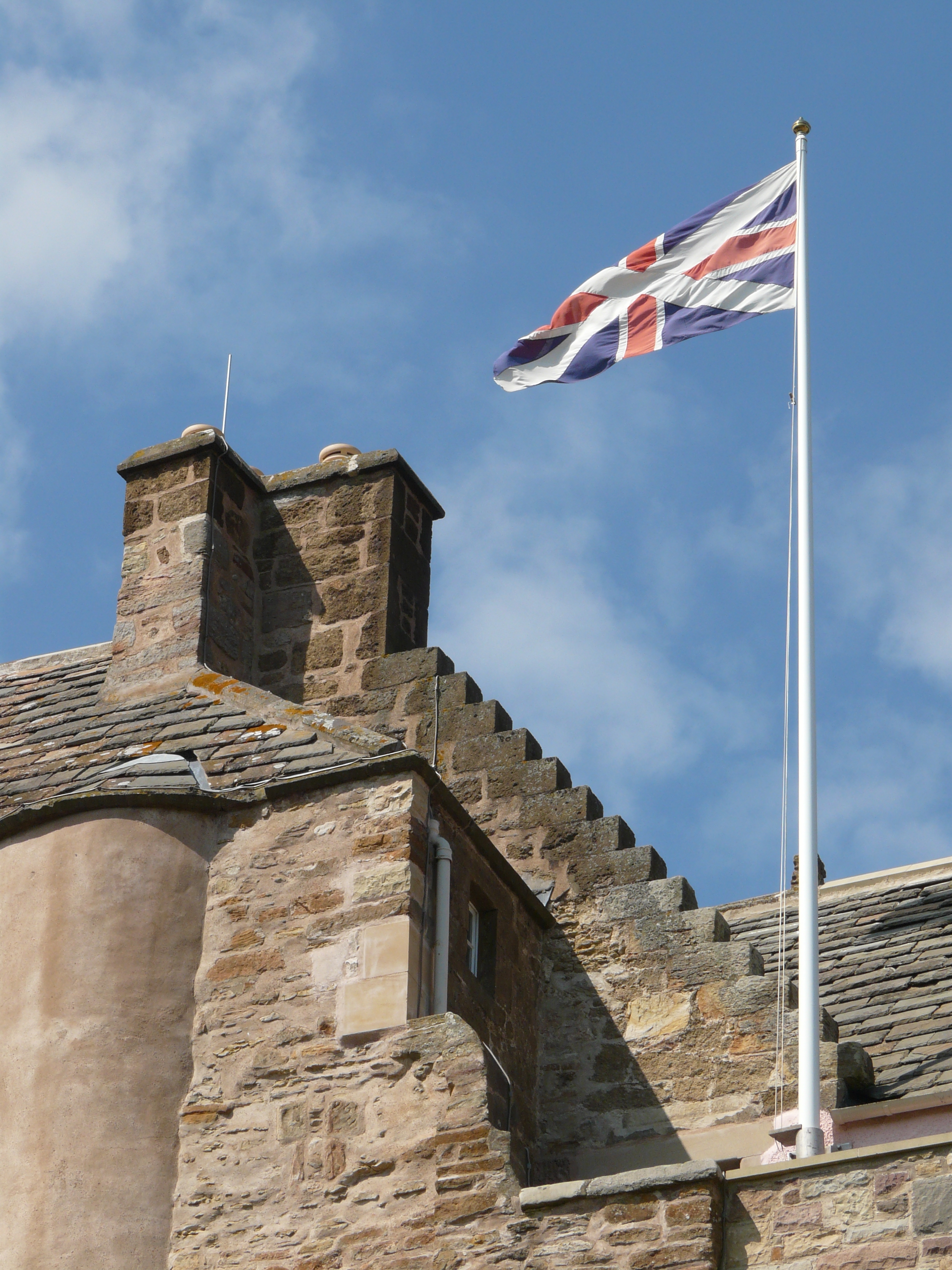
17th Century Scottish variant of Union flag at Lennoxlove House, East Lothian, Scotland

== See also ==
- List of flags of the United Kingdom
- List of flags with Christian symbolism
- List of English flags
- List of Scottish flags
- Protectorate Jack
- Union Flag
