= Reform Group =

Reform Group may refer to:

- Reform Group (Finland), a defunct political party in Finland
- The Reform Group, an organisation in the Republic of Ireland
