= Commonwealth flags =

Commonwealth flags may refer to:

- The Flag of the Commonwealth of Nations and its predecessor
- Flags of the Interregnum (British Isles), the flags used by the Commonwealth of England

== See also ==
- Commonwealth (U.S. state), which lists those states' flags
- Member states of the Commonwealth of Nations, which lists those states' flags
