= List of Saint Patrick's crosses =

A variety of crosses, both designs and physical objects, have been associated with Saint Patrick, the patron saint of Ireland. Traditionally, the cross pattée has been associated with him, but in more recent times, the Saint Patrick's Saltire has also been linked to him. Some authors have stated, however, that Patrick is not entitled to have a cross as a symbol since he was not a martyr, unlike Saints George and Andrew.

== Celtic Cross ==
Celtic Cross

It is popularly believed that St. Patrick introduced the Celtic Cross in Ireland, during his conversion of the provincial kings from paganism to Christianity. St Patrick is said to have taken the symbol of the sun and extended one of the lengths to form a melding of the Christian Cross and the sun.

== Saltire ==
Saint Patrick's Flag

Saint Patrick's Saltire is a red saltire on a white field. It is used in the insignia of the Order of Saint Patrick, established in 1783, and after the Acts of Union 1800 it was combined with the Saint George's Cross of England and the Saint Andrew's Cross of Scotland to form the Union Flag of the United Kingdom of Great Britain and Ireland. A saltire was intermittently used as a symbol of Ireland from the seventeenth century, but without reference to Saint Patrick.

The Pepys Library's collection of broadside ballads includes one from c. 1690 called "Teague and Sawney: or The Unfortunate Success of a Dear-Joys Devotion by St. Patrick's Cross. Being Transform'd into the Deel's Whirlegig." It describes an Irishman (Teague) and Scot (Sawney), both stereotypically blockheaded, encountering a windmill for the first time and arguing over whether it is Saint Andrew's Cross or Saint Patrick's Cross.

== Cross pattée ==
A cross pattée

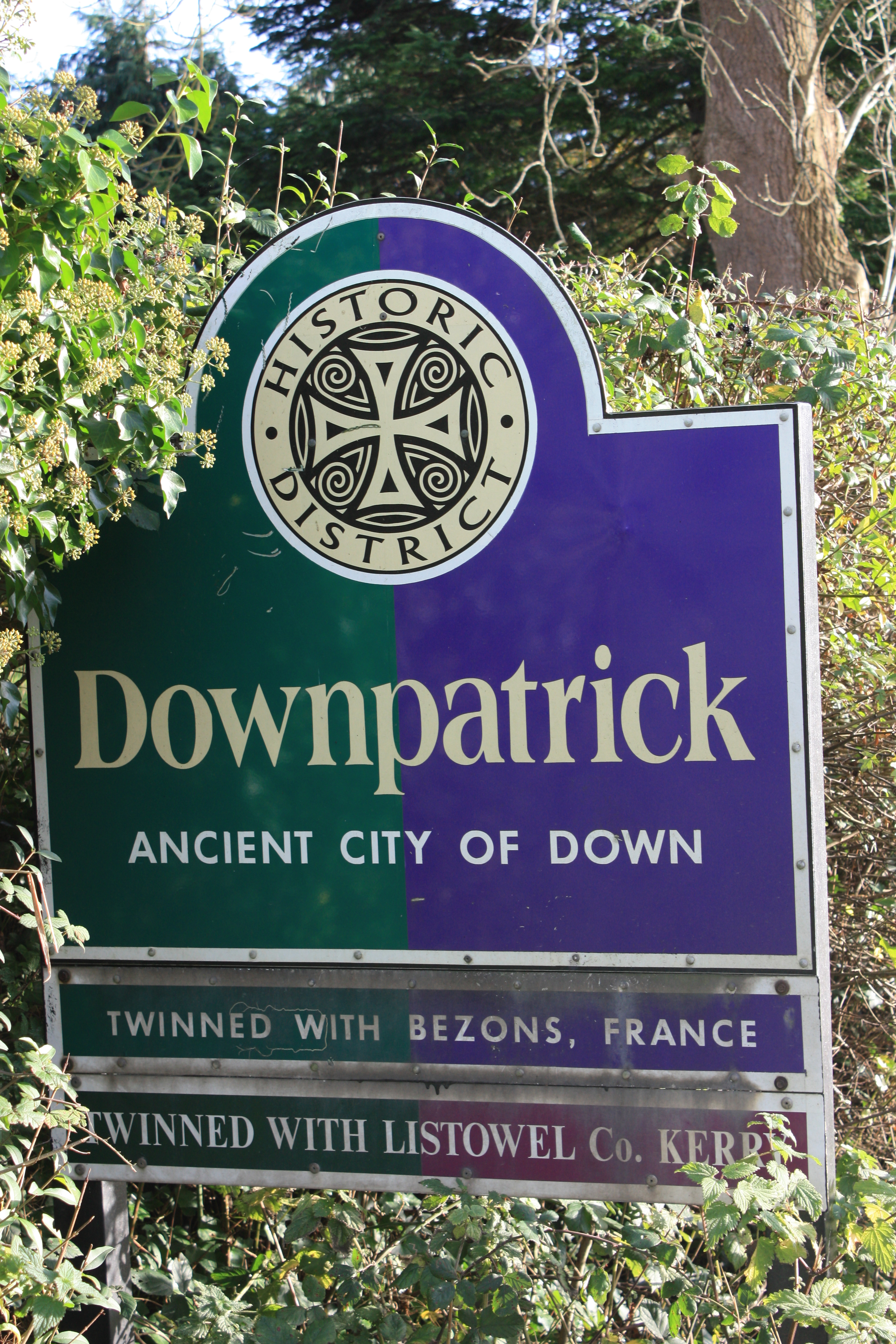
Downpatrick road sign showing the cross pattée, October 2009

Some of the Order of St Patrick's symbols were borrowed from the pre-existing Friendly Brothers of St Patrick, including the motto Quis separabit?; however, the "Saint Patrick's Cross" used in the Friendly Brothers' badge was not a saltire. A 1783 letter to a Dublin newspaper criticising the Order's use of a saltire, asserted that "The Cross generally used on St Patrick's day, by Irishmen, is the Cross-Patee". Whereas Vincent Morley in 1999 characterised the Friendly Brothers' cross as a cross pattée, the Brothers' medallist in 2003 said that the shape varied somewhat, often approximating a Maltese Cross. Varying illustrations of the badge figure in the Brothers' 1763 statute book, a 1786 letter to The Gentleman's Magazine, and a 2008 photograph.

Though both pattée and Patrick begin with pat-, the words are unrelated.

== Or a Cross Gules ==
Henry Gough in 1893 noted that Ireland was represented by a harp in the flags of the Protectorate, but at Oliver Cromwell's funeral the national banners had crosses, Ireland's being a red cross on a gold field. Gough guesses Edward Bysshe may have co-opted the de Burgh Earl of Ulster arms for the purpose. Gough suggests it gained currency in subsequent decades; it was called Patrick's Cross and shown alongside those of George and Andrew in various documents, including a 1697 drawing of William III, and The Irish Compendium of 1722. A 1679 pamphlet account of heraldry states that the arms borne in the Crusades by the Irish Nation were "a red Cross in a yellow Field". In 1688, Randle Holme explicitly calls this (Or a Cross Gules) "St. Patrick's Cross" "for Ireland". The County Galway unit of the Irish Volunteers in 1914 adopted a similar banner because "it was used as the Irish flag in Cromwell's time". The flag used by the King's Own Regiment in the Kingdom of Ireland, established in 1653, was a red saltire on a "taffey" yellow background. The origins of the regimental colours remain a mystery however.

== Other heraldic designs ==
A cross moline

In 1593–94, Irish Catholics in Habsburg Spain made unrealised plans for a "military order of Saint Patrick" to fight in the Nine Years' War, whose knights would wear a cross moline badge.

A 1935 article states that during the Confederation, "the true St. Patrick's Cross was carried as a square flag: a white cross on a green ground, with a red circle."

== Monuments ==
Ancient high crosses called "Saint Patrick's cross" existed at places with legendary associations with the saint: the Rock of Cashel, where he baptised Óengus mac Nad Froích, King of Munster. and Station Island, site of Saint Patrick's Purgatory, in Lough Derg, County Donegal. Until the 18th century there was a "St Patrick's Cross" in Liverpool, marking the spot where he supposedly preached before starting his mission to Ireland.

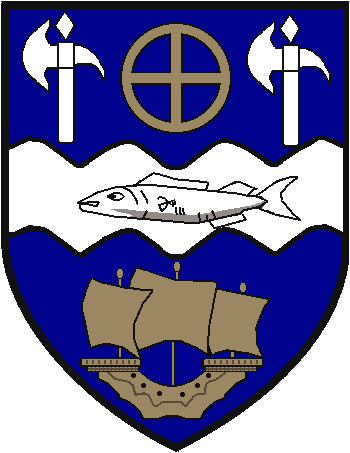
Ballina crest, including stylised Patrick's Cross carving between two pikes

The arms of Ballina, County Mayo, adopted in 1970, include an image of "St Patrick's cross" carved on a rock in Leigue cemetery, said to date from Patrick's visit there in AD 441.

== Saint Patrick's Day badges ==
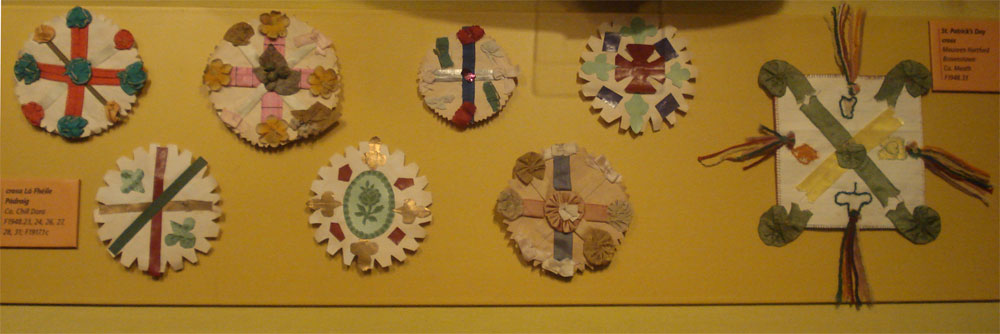
Traditional St. Patrick's Day badges from the early 20th century, from the Museum of Country Life, Castlebar.

It was formerly a common custom to wear a cross made of paper or ribbon on St Patrick's Day. Surviving examples of such badges come in a variety of colours and they were worn upright rather than as saltires.

The second part of Richard Johnson's Seven Champions of Christendom (1608) concludes its fanciful account of St Patrick with, "the Irishmen as well in England as in that Country, do as yet in Honour of his Name, keep one day in the Year Festival, wearing upon their Hats each of them a Cross of red Silk, in Token of his many Adventures, under the Christian Cross". Irish soldiers stationed in Britain in 1628 reportedly wore red crosses on Patrick's Day "after their country manner".

Thomas Dinely, an English traveller in Ireland in 1681, remarked that "the Irish of all stations and condicõns were crosses in their hatts, some of pins, some of green ribbon." Jonathan Swift, writing to "Stella" of Saint Patrick's Day 1713, said "the Mall was so full of crosses that I thought all the world was Irish". The crosses were also associated with Irish regiments, who were reported in 1682 to have been seen wearing crosses of red ribbon on St Patrick's Day; and with the English court, who were said to have worn crosses in honour of St Patrick on the saint's day in 1726. In the 1740s, the badges pinned were multicoloured interlaced fabric. In the 1820s, they were only worn by children, with simple multicoloured daisy patterns. In the 1890s, they were almost extinct, and a simple green Greek cross inscribed in a circle of paper (similar to the Ballina crest pictured). The Irish Times in 1935 reported they were still sold in poorer parts of Dublin, but fewer than those of previous years "some in velvet or embroidered silk or poplin, with the gold paper cross entwined with shamrocks and ribbons".

== Others ==
On the St. Patrick halfpenny, Patrick is depicted holding a crozier headed with a patriarchal cross.

The badge of the Companions of Saint Patrick, a nonpartisan but mainly unionist group of Dublin civic leaders active from 1906 until the 1930s, featured a red Celtic cross on a white background.
