= Saint Patrick's Saltire =

Red saltire on a white field

Saint Patrick's Flag: a red saltire on a field of white

Saint Patrick's Saltire or Saint Patrick's Cross is a red saltire (X-shaped cross) on a white field. In heraldic language, it may be blazoned argent, a saltire gules. Saint Patrick's Flag (Irish: Bratach Naomh Pádraig) is a flag composed of Saint Patrick's Saltire. The origin of the saltire is disputed. Its association with Saint Patrick dates from the 1780s, when the Anglo-Irish Order of Saint Patrick adopted it as an emblem. This was a British chivalric order established in 1783 by George III. It has been suggested that it derives from the arms of the powerful Geraldine or FitzGerald dynasty. Some Irish nationalists opposed the usage of the flag to represent Ireland, as they considered it to be a British invention.

After its adoption by the Order of Saint Patrick, it began to be used by other institutions. When the Acts of Union 1800 joined the Kingdom of Ireland with the Kingdom of Great Britain, the saltire was added to the British flag to form the Union Flag still used by the United Kingdom. The saltire has occasionally served unofficially to represent Northern Ireland and also appears in some royal events.

== Origins ==
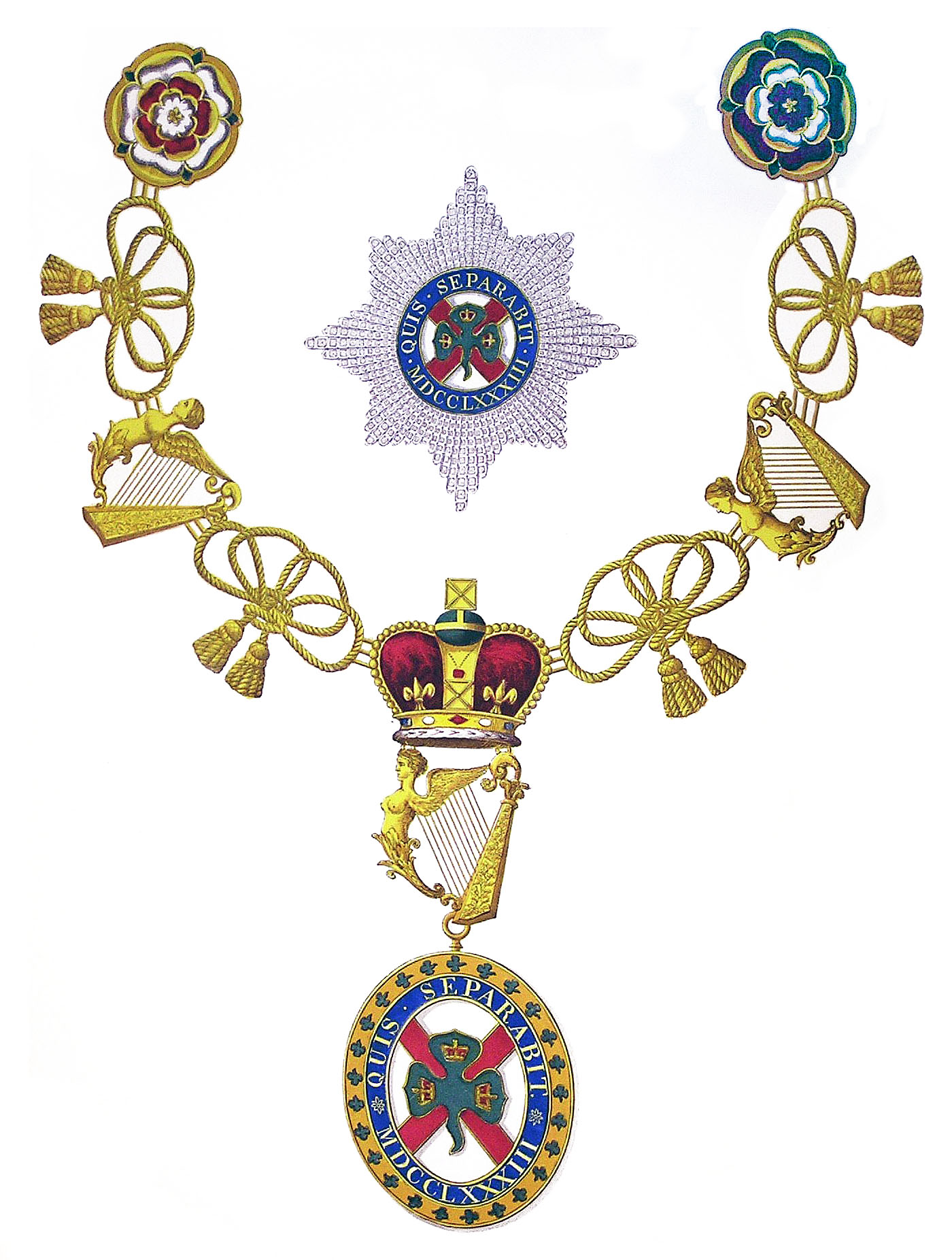
Insignia of a Knight of St Patrick: Gold crowns on a green shamrock on a red Cross of Saint Patrick

An early possible mention of a Saint Patrick's flag is from the journal of John Glanville, writing about the Anglo-Dutch fleet that sailed to Cádiz, Spain, in 1625. Lord Delaware deposed in writing to the Lieutenant General about his simple foretop (white, red or blue) precedence flags to be flown:

...That this was an Englishe and not an Irishe action, and the colours contended for the fflagg of S^{t} George and not of S^{t} Patericke [alluding to whatever the Viscount Valentia was flying], which hee intimated to himselfe being a Baron of England much auntient to my Lord Cromwell (whoe alsoe is a Baron of that Realme) to bee more proper and worthie to carry then anie Irish Viscount...

The Order of Saint Patrick, an Anglo-Irish chivalric order, was created in 1783. The order was a means of rewarding those in high office who supported the Anglo-Irish government of Ireland. On its badge was a red saltire on a white background, which it called the "Cross of St Patrick":

And the said Badge shall be of Gold surrounded with a Wreath of Shamrock or Trefoil, within which shall be a Circle of Gold, containing the Motto of our said Order in Letters of Gold Viz. QUIS SEPARABIT? together with the date 1783, being the year in which our said Order was founded, and encircling the Cross of St Patrick Gules, surmounted with a Trefoil Vert each of its leaves charged with an Imperial Crown Or upon a field of Argent.

The use of a saltire in association with St Patrick was controversial because it differed from the usual crosses by custom worn on St Patrick's Day. In particular, the previous crosses associated with Saint Patrick were not X-shaped. Some contemporary responses to the badge of the order complained that an X-shaped cross was the Cross of St Andrew, patron of Scotland. A February 1783 newspaper complained that "the breasts of Irishmen were to be decorated by the bloody Cross of St Andrew, and not that of the tutelar Saint of their natural isle". Another article claimed that "the Cross of St Andrew the Scotch saint is to honour the Irish order of St Patrick, by being inserted within the star of the order ... a manifest insult to common sense and to national propriety".

A cross pattée

An open letter to Lord Temple, to whom the design of the Order of St Patrick's badges were entrusted, echoes this and elaborates:

The Cross generally used on St Patrick's day, by Irishmen, is the Cross pattée, which is small in the centre, and so goes on widening to the ends, which are very broad; this is not recorded as the Irish Cross, but has custom for time immemorial for its support, which is generally allowed as sufficient authority for any similar institution ... As bearing the arms of another person is reckoned very disgraceful by the laws of honour, how much more so is it, in an order which ought to carry honour to the highest pitch, to take a cross for its emblem, which has been acknowledged for many ages as the property of an order in another country? If the cross generally worn as the emblem of the Saint who is ascribed to Ireland is not agreeable to your Excellency, sure many others are left to choose from, without throwing Ireland into so ignominious a point of view, as to adopt the one that Scotland has so long a claim to.

Coat of arms of the Duke of Leinster, derived from those of the FitzGeralds

Many subsequent commentators believed that the saltire was simply taken from the arms of the FitzGeralds (or "Geraldines"), who were Dukes of Leinster. The Dukes of Leinster dominated the political and social scene of 18th-century Dublin, from their ducal palace of Leinster House (later to become the seat of the Irish parliament and senate, the Oireachtas). William FitzGerald, 2nd Duke of Leinster was the premier peer in the Irish House of Lords and a founder member of the Order of Saint Patrick. On the other hand, Michael Casey suggests that Lord Temple, pressed for time, had based the Order's insignia on those of the Order of the Garter, and simply rotated its St George's Cross 45 degrees.

Henry Gough in 1893 doubted the antiquity of Patrick's Cross on the basis that, if a cross had been an established symbol of Ireland during the Protectorate, then flags of the era would have used that instead of the gold Irish harp.

=== Earlier use of saltires in an Irish context ===
A variety of sources show saltires in use earlier than 1783 in Ireland and in an Irish context, although there is no suggestion that they are linked to St Patrick. The Flag Institute states that arms derive from those of the powerful FitzGerald dynasty (or "Geraldines"), who were Earls of Kildare (and later Dukes of Leinster). Gearóid Mór FitzGerald and his son Gearóid Óg were also Lord Deputies of Ireland in the late 15th and early 16th centuries.

The design on the reverse of some Irish coins (groat and half-groat) minted c. 1480 includes two shields with saltires. At this time, Gearóid Mór FitzGerald was Lord Deputy of Ireland, and the shields are considered to be his arms.

A 1576 map of Ireland (or "Hirlandia") by John Goghe shows the FitzGerald arms over their spheres of influence. It also shows a red saltire flag flying at the masthead of a ship, possibly an Irish pirate, which is engaged in action in Saint George's Channel with another ship flying Saint George's cross. The red saltire is placed on the Mulls of Galloway and Kintyre in Scotland. This is either a defect of the print or as it was confused with Scotland's Saint Andrew's saltire.

Cross of Burgundy

English and German picture maps of the Battle of Kinsale of 1601–02 show the combined Irish–Spanish forces under a red saltire. This is presumed to be the Cross of Burgundy, the war flag of Spain, rather than an Irish flag.

A 1612 seal of Trinity College Dublin shows uncoloured cross and saltire flags. These have been taken to represent England and Ireland respectively.

Standard of the Confederate Irish expedition to Scotland.

Contemporary reports of the ensigns of the Irish Catholic Confederation during the Eleven Years' War say that each had a canton with a red saltire on a gold field. A 1645 picture map of the Siege of Duncannon shows Preston's Irish Confederates under a saltire.

The flag used by the King's Own Regiment in the Kingdom of Ireland, established in 1653, was a red saltire on a "taffey" yellow field. Its origin remains a mystery, however. At the funeral of Oliver Cromwell in 1658, Ireland was represented by a red cross (not saltire) on a yellow field. Cromwell's Protectorate of the 1650s briefly used a flag containing the St George's cross to represent England, St Andrew's cross to represent Scotland, and a red saltire on white to represent Ireland, though Ireland was more commonly represented with a harp in Protectorate flags. Several drawings of Union flags, including one of HMS Henry made c. 1661 by Willem van de Velde, the elder, include a red saltire as in the post-1800 Union; but there is no evidence for such a design. The Graydon MS. Flag Book of 1686, which belonged to Samuel Pepys, gives the flag of Ireland as the harp and St George's cross on a green field.

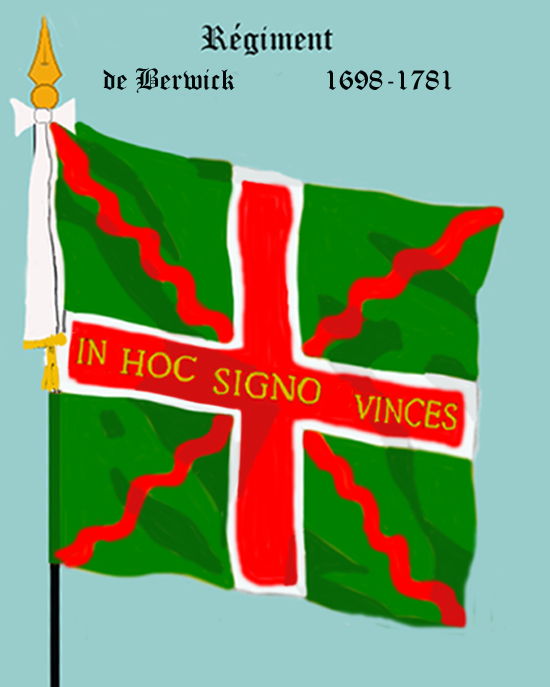
Flag of the Régiment de Berwick

A red saltire on green appears on the flag of Berwick's regiment in the Irish Brigade of the French army. This was a brigade made up of Irish Jacobite exiles that formed in 1690. The Irish Brigade served as part of the French Army until 1792.

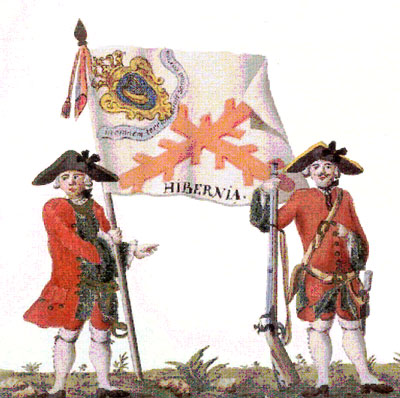
Uniform and colonel's flag of the Regiment of Hibernia in Spanish service, mid-18th century

The cross of Burgundy appears on the flag of the Spanish Regiment of Hibernia. It was formed in 1710 by Irishmen who fled their own country in the wake of the Flight of the Earls and the penal laws. It is possible that the design of the flag was influenced by the red saltire.

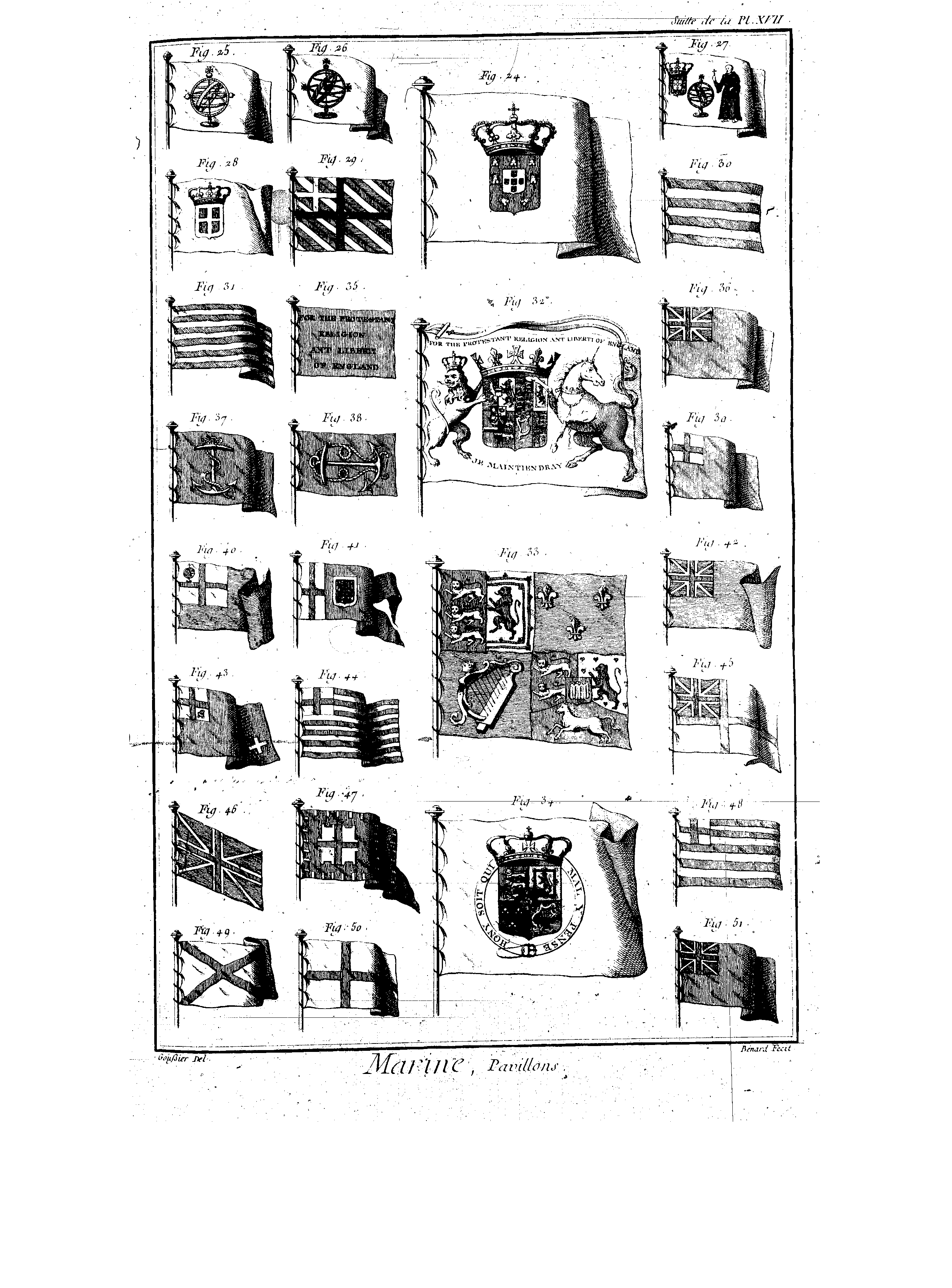
The Encyclopédie, ou Dictionnaire raisonné des sciences, des arts et des métiers (1769 edition) illustrates one of three maritime flags of Ireland (bottom left), described as white, charged with a red saltire. One other flag is also white with a red saltire, while the remaining maritime flag is Green with a golden harp with a silver quarter bearing a red cross.

Several atlases and flag books in the late 17th and 18th centuries show a red-saltire–on–white flag for Ireland, including Paulus van der Dussen's (c. 1690) and Le Neptune françois, a marine atlas published in Amsterdam in 1693, where it is depicted with the legends Ierse above and Irlandois below, which are Dutch and French for "Irish". Jan Blaeu's 1650s atlas has a saltire on white for Ireland, which is hand-coloured red in some copies.

According to a newspaper report from Waterford in 1785, two years after the Order of St Patrick had been founded:

Upwards of forty vessels are now in our harbour, victualling for Newfoundland, of which number thirteen are of our own nation, who wear the St Patrick's flag (the field of which is white, with a St Patrick's cross, and an harp in one quarter.)

=== Other St Patrick's crosses ===
Other crosses besides the red saltire have been associated with Saint Patrick. Crosses in various shapes and colours were worn as badges on St Patrick's Day from the 17th to the early 20th century. The cross pattée has also been used, including by the Friendly Brothers of Saint Patrick, a fraternal organisation whose symbols influenced those of the Order of Saint Patrick.

== Modern use of the flag ==
Flag of the Kingdom of Great Britain

Flag of the United Kingdom

The most widespread use of St Patrick's Saltire today is in the Flag of the United Kingdom. With the 1800 Act of Union that merged the kingdoms of Great Britain and Ireland, the red saltire was incorporated into the Flag of the United Kingdom as representing Ireland. The red saltire is counterchanged with the saltire of St Andrew, such that the white always follows the red clockwise. The arrangement accounts for the discontinuous look of the red diagonal lines, and has introduced a requirement to display the flag "the right way up", with the white line of St Andrew above the red of St Patrick in the upper lefthand quarter next to the flagpole. As with the red cross, so too the red saltire is separated by a white fimbriation from the blue field. This fimbriation is repeated for symmetry on the white portion of the saltire, which thereby appears wider than the red portion. The fimbriation of the cross of St George separates its red from the red of the saltire.

Flags in Northern Ireland are controversial, their symbolism reflecting underlying sectarian and political differences. Saint Patrick's Saltire is sometimes used as a cross-community symbol with less political baggage than either the Union Flag or the Ulster Banner, seen as pro-Unionist, or the Irish tricolour used by Irish nationalists.

It is one of two flags authorised to be flown on church grounds by the Church of Ireland, the other being the Compass Rose Flag of the Anglican Communion. This was the recommendation of a 1999 synod committee on sectarianism.

It is one of the flags approved by the Orange Institution for display during Orange walks.

The St Patrick's flag is the flag of St Patrick's College, Maynooth, and is flown on Degree days and other important occasions. Its use is not affected by the creation of a separate National University of Ireland, Maynooth in 1997. The Royal Dublin Society's flag, dating from c. 1902 – c. 1912, has a red saltire, but its significance is unknown. The Irish Free State Girl Guides, descended from the Unionist British Girl Guides, had a Saint Patrick's Saltire on the flag it used from its establishment in 1929 until the 1937 Constitution. The saltire appeared on the house flag of Irish Shipping, founded 1941, and that used by Irish Continental Line in 1973–1978. It replaced the St George's Cross in 1970 on the flag of the Commissioners of Irish Lights. The badge of the Royal Society of Antiquaries of Ireland, designed by John Vinycomb, incorporates the saltire and the arms of the four provinces.

Flag of the Commissioners of Irish Lights

Burgee of Dublin Bay Sailing Club

Flag of Rathmines and Rathgar Urban District Council (1929–1930)

House flag of Irish Shipping (1947–1984)

House flag of Irish Shipping (1941–1947)

House flag of Irish Continental Line (1973–1978)

=== Official uses of St Patrick's Saltire ===
Aside from appearing in the Union Flag of the United Kingdom of Great Britain and Northern Ireland, there are few other uses for the St Patrick's Saltire in official governmental use.

It was the basis of the police badge of the new Police Service of Northern Ireland.

In 2023, the British Army's 204 (North Irish) Field Hospital and 253 (North Irish) Medical Regiments merged to create 210 (North Irish) Multi-Role Medical Regiment. This amalgamated regiment uses St Patrick's saltire in the background of the regimental insignia. This is overlaid by symbols of the Caduceus and Irish shamrock.

Police Service of Northern Ireland Symbol

Regimental Insignia of 210 (North Irish) Multi-Role Medical Regiment, RAMC, British Army

=== In heraldry ===
Regardless of the uncertainty over its origins, the red saltire, or saltire gules on a white field was used in the arms adopted by various Irish organisations, and some outside Ireland.

The arms of Trinity College Dublin show two flags, a red cross on white and a red saltire on white, which Hayes-McCoy and Galloway interpret as representing England and Ireland respectively. The arms were granted by Arthur Vicars in 1901, based on a 1612 seal showing uncoloured cross and saltire flags. Bernard Burke's 1864 armory does not specify the flag's format, and nineteenth-century depictions of them vary.

The arms of Cork city show red-saltire flags on the two towers, though not on versions prior to 1800. Coleraine Borough Council includes Saint Patrick's Saltire, as Patrick is said to have given Coleraine its name. The arms of Belfast shows a ship flying two flags with a red saltire on white. The saltire also appears in the coat of arms of the County Mayo town of Westport to commemorate the visit of St Patrick to the nearby mountain, Croagh Patrick. It also appears on the arms of Co. Fermanagh The Urban District Council of Rathmines and Rathgar was granted arms in 1929, a year before it was absorbed into Dublin Corporation; these featured a Saint Patrick's Saltire and a Celtic Cross. A red saltire also appears on the arms of County Kildare, but this is because of the association of Kildare with the FitzGerald family.

The original arms of the Royal Irish Academy in 1786 did not have the saltire, but those granted in 1846 do. There are red saltires in the arms of the Queen's University in Ireland (est. 1850, arms granted 1851, dissolved 1879), its successor, Queen's University Belfast (est. 1908, arms granted 1910), and the Royal College of Surgeons in Ireland.

Flag of the Royal College of Surgeons in Ireland

Flag of Trinity College Dublin

Standard of Queen's University Belfast

The Church of Ireland diocese of Connor's arms, granted in 1945, include Saint Patrick's Saltire in memory of his supposed enslavement at Slemish. The Church of England Diocese of Truro, established in 1876, has a Saint Patrick's Saltire in its arms, representing "the ancient Celtic Church". The Roman Catholic Archdiocese of New York, whose cathedral is St Patrick's, incorporates the saltire.

St Patrick's National School in Drumcondra, Dublin City has a saltire on its arms St. Patrick's High School, Ottawa has the saltire in its flag and arms.

Arms of Trinity College Dublin

Arms of Belfast

Arms of Cork

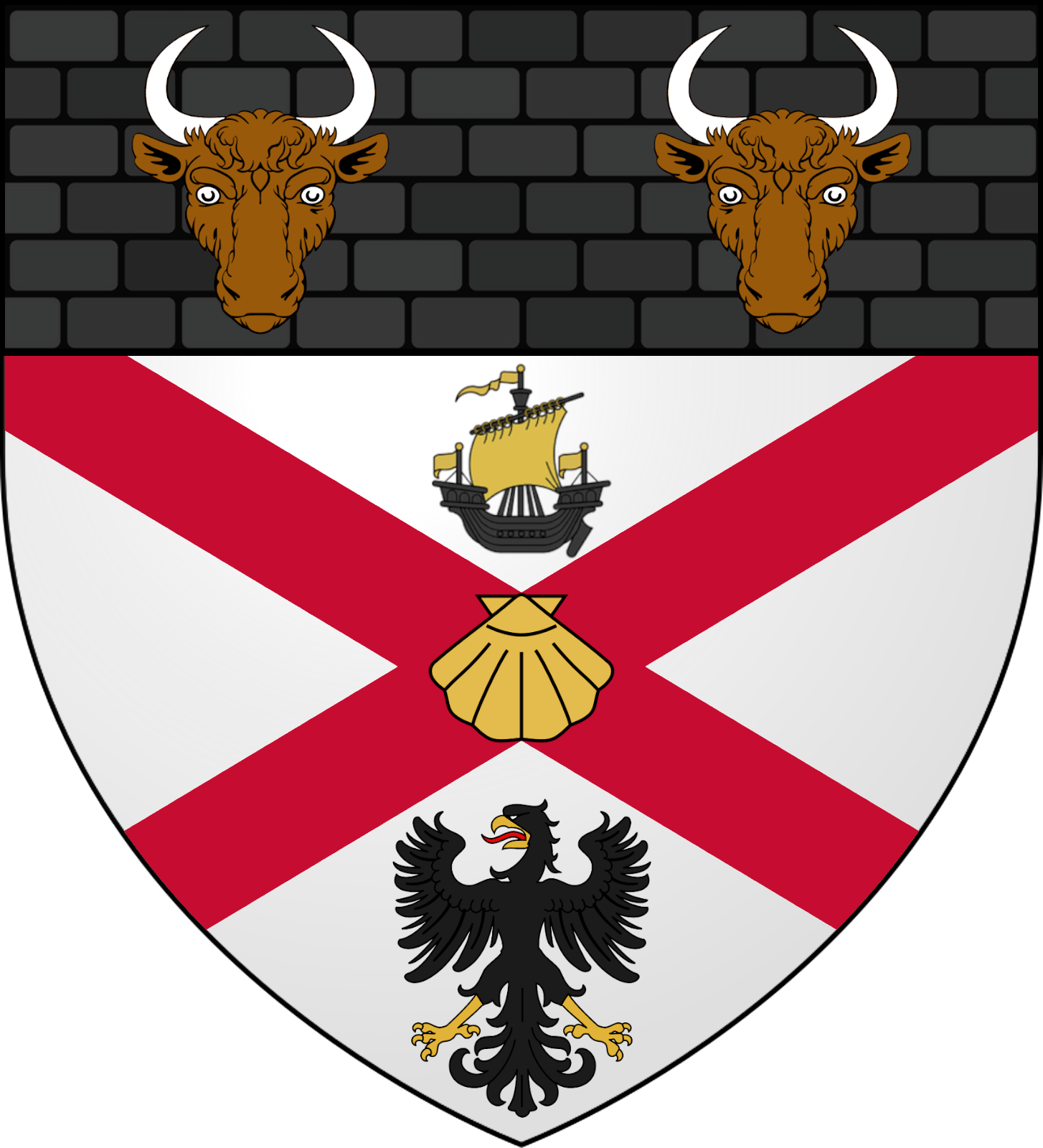
Arms of Westport

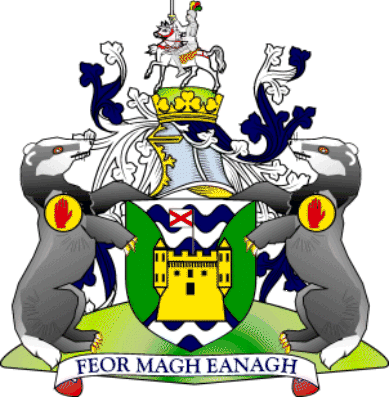
Arms of County Fermanagh

Arms of the Diocese of Connor

Arms of the Diocese of Meath and Kildare

Arms of the Diocese of Truro

Arms of the Roman Catholic Archdiocese of New York

Unofficial arms of Manitoba (1870–1905)

=== To represent Ireland or Northern Ireland ===
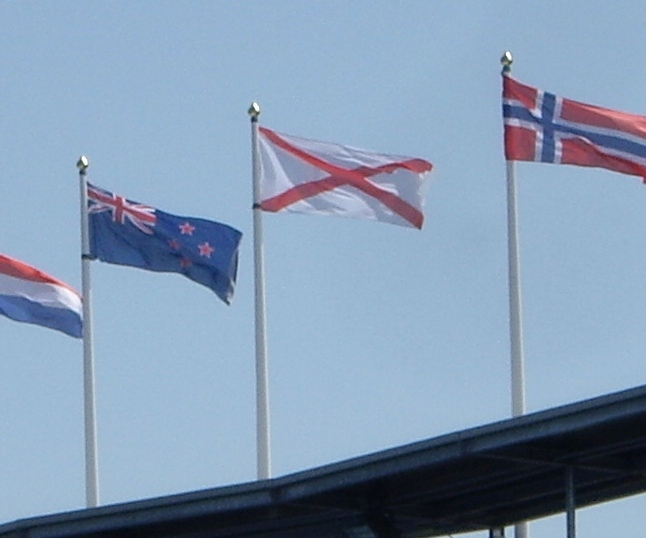
St Patrick's Saltire flying for Northern Ireland at the 2011 Royal Edinburgh Military Tattoo (left to right: The Netherlands, New Zealand, Northern Ireland, Norway)

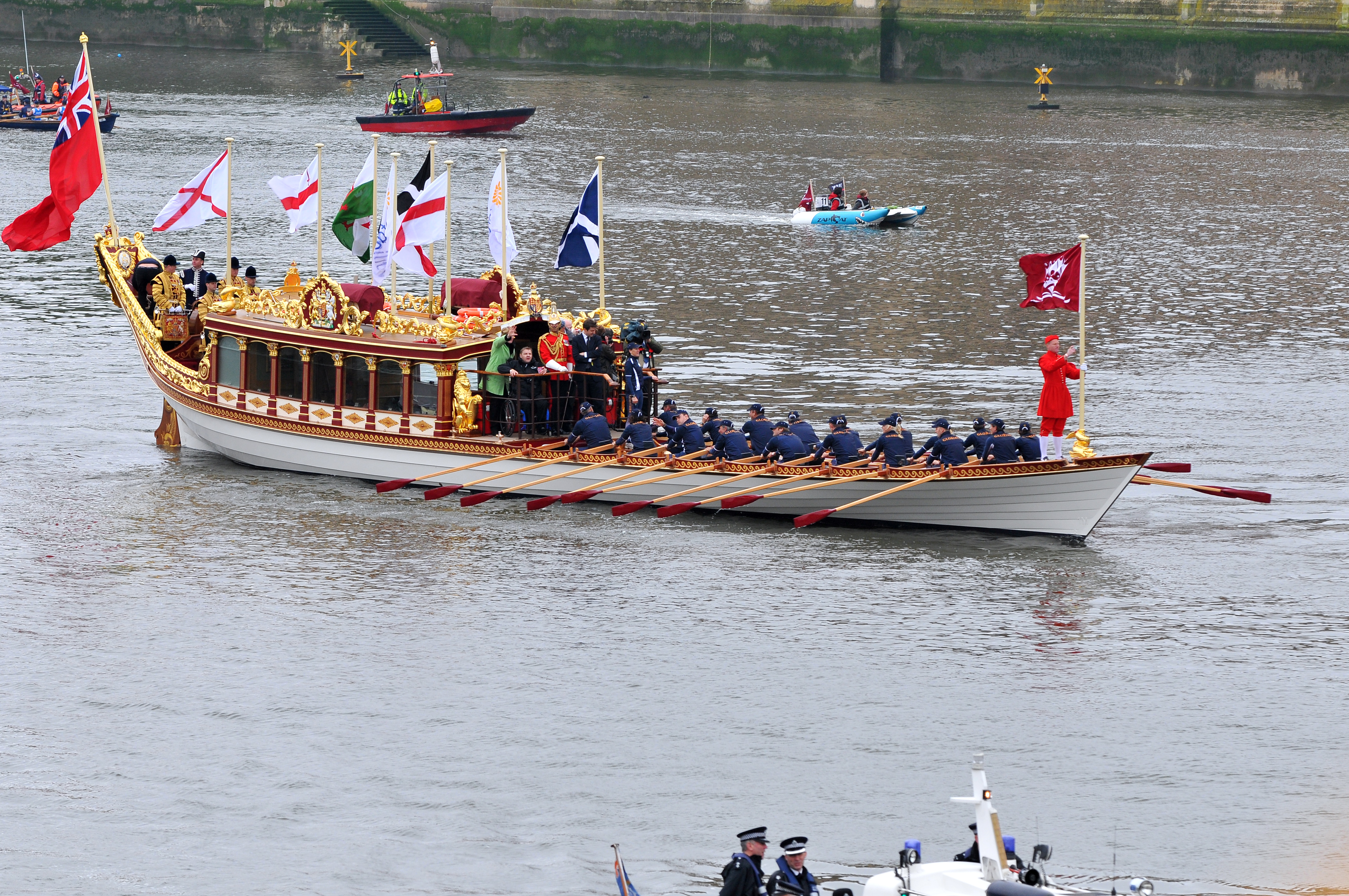
St Patrick's Saltire flying for Northern Ireland from The Royal Barge Gloriana at the Thames Diamond Jubilee Pageant on 3 June 2012

At the 1935 celebrations in London for George V's silver jubilee, "The cross of St George representing England and Wales, and the saltires of St Andrew and St Patrick, representing Scotland and Ireland" were flown separately and used in combination. At the time the Irish Free State was a separate Dominion within the British Commonwealth. In 1986, government policy during state visits to London was to fly the crosses of Saints George, Andrew and Patrick and the Welsh Dragon. The government clarified that the Union Flag was the flag of Northern Ireland, not Saint Patrick's Saltire or the Ulster Banner.

The barge Gloriana during the 2012 Thames Diamond Jubilee Pageant flew flags for the five "home nations" of the United Kingdom, including Saint Piran for Cornwall, Saint Andrew for Scotland, Saint George for England, Saint David for Wales and Saint Patrick's Saltire for Northern Ireland. In this context, the symbol was referred to as St Patrick's Cross.

The International Volleyball Federation uses Saint Patrick's Saltire to represent Northern Ireland national volleyball teams.

The all-island bodies for men's and ladies' bowls compete internationally under Saint Patrick's flag.

The Unionist politician David McNarry has suggested the saltire should be allowed in Northern Irish number plates analogous to the flags allowed on English, Scottish, and Welsh plates.

=== On St Patrick's Day ===
Saint Patrick's Flag is sometimes seen during Saint Patrick's Day parades in Northern Ireland and Britain. Flags are handed out by Down District Council before the Downpatrick parade, near Patrick's burial place at Down Cathedral, in an attempt to create a parade that has cross-community support. This has had only limited success, however, and controversy continues over the use of flags in the parade. In Great Britain, Saint Patrick's Flag was flown in place of the Irish tricolour at the 2009 parade in Croydon, prompting complaints from some councillors. It was flown on some years on Patrick's Day by Bradford City Council, which subsequently reverted to flying the Irish tricolour.

=== In political movements ===
Saint Patrick's Saltire was on the flag proposed in 1914 of the County Down unit of Irish Volunteers. A writer in The Irish Volunteer complained that The O'Rahilly should have known the saltire was "faked for Union Jack purposes".

In 1932–33 a variation of the flag with a St Patrick's blue background was adopted as the badge and flag of the short-lived Blueshirt fascist movement. This militant group incorporated right-wing, conservative and some former-unionist elements in opposition to the then left-wing republican Fianna Fáil party.

A flag combining St Andrew's Saltire, St Patrick's Saltire, and the Red Hand of Ulster has been used by Ulster separatists, who wish to see Northern Ireland leave the United Kingdom and become an independent state, not joining with the Republic of Ireland.

The saltire was incorporated in the badge of the Reform Movement, for some time after its inception in 1998, but this no longer so prominent. The Reform Group is a "post-nationalist" pressure group in the Republic of Ireland seeking closer ties with the United Kingdom.

Historical flag of the Blueshirts, and early Fine Gael

Flag proposed by the Ulster Independence Movement; also sometimes used in UDA

== Other symbols of Ireland ==
The arms of Ireland since the 16th century have been a gold harp with silver strings on a blue field. It represented Ireland in the flags of earlier unions: the Commonwealth Flag (England and Ireland, 1649) and the Protectorate Jack (England, Ireland and Scotland, 1658). It also featured on the Royal Standard since James I.

The Celtic cross and Brigid's cross are other crosses which have been used as symbols of Ireland.

== Unrelated similar saltires ==
Other flags exist which feature a red saltire on a white field.

The flag of Jersey has unknown origins, and a link with St Patrick's saltire has been proposed. The FitzGerald family, who were powerful in Ireland, were Anglo-Norman in origin and also owned land in Jersey. Alternatively, N. V. L. Rybot in 1951 suggested that Jersey's flag originated from a mistake in a 1783 flag book by Carington Bowles, which was copied by later authors. Rybot's theory is that Bowles misinterpreted Ierse (Dutch for "Irish") as meaning "Jersey" in a Dutch flag-book he used as a source. However, John Tessin-Yandell claims a 1757 French Admiralty chart shows the red saltire for Jersey. It was widely felt in Jersey that the flag's similarity to St Patrick's Saltire was causing confusion, and so an amended flag was adopted by the States of Jersey on 12 June 1979, proclaimed by Queen Elizabeth on 10 December 1980 and first officially hoisted on 7 April 1981. The amended flag includes in the upper quadrant the badge of Jersey (a red shield holding the three leopards of Normandy in yellow) surmounted by a yellow "Plantagenet crown".

The Flag of Florida is a red saltire on a white field, with the state seal in the centre. The Florida Department of State calls this saltire a Saint Andrew's Cross. Some historians see its adoption in 1900 as alluding to the Confederate Battle Flag. Sources which ascribe Florida's saltire to Saint Patrick include an article in the Orlando Sentinel and a column in which Joseph Cotto suggests it was a symbol of Florida's Britishness.

The flag of Alabama is "a crimson cross of St. Andrew on a field of white".

The flag of Valdivia, though is same color and design of saltire, is in fact derived from the Spanish Cross of Burgundy, but without the little branches

The village of Luqa in Malta also has a similar flag. Its origins are unknown; however, the flag is almost identical to the personal flag of Grandmaster Piero de Ponte who ruled the Maltese islands from 1534 to 1535.

In the system of International maritime signal flags, a red saltire on a white background denotes the letter V and the message "I require assistance".

In the Shanghai International Settlement, the Shanghai Municipal Council used a flag with a red saltire on a white field, with its seal in the middle.

The arms of West Dunbartonshire derive from the former arms of the burgh of Clydebank, including a red saltire as the arms of Lennox. Since Old Kilpatrick, a legendary birthplace of Saint Patrick, is in the district, the association of Saint Patrick's Saltire may be considered appropriate, if coincidental.

Flag of Alabama

Flag of the governor of Alabama

Flag of Jersey

Flag of Jersey (before 1981)

Flag of Luqa, Malta

Flag of Valdivia, Chile

Flag of Bexhill-on-Sea

Flag of Penrith, Cumbria

Flag of Florida

Burgee of Porthpean Sailing Club, Cornwall

Flag of the Empire of China, December 1915 – March 1916

Flag of Shanghai Municipal Council, Shanghai International Settlement, c. 1917 – 1941

Flag of Montreal, 1935–1939

== See also ==
- List of Irish flags
- List of United Kingdom flags
