= Flag of Somerset County, Maryland =

Somerset County
- Use: Small vexillological symbol or pictogram in black and white showing the different uses of the flag
- Proportion: 2:3
- Adopted: 1694

The Flag of Somerset County, Maryland, United States, consists of a flag of Great Britain with the head of a Native American in the center. The flag was adopted in 1694 after the county received a royal warrant from King William III of England to use the Union Jack as its flag. That flag was later adopted by the Kingdom of Great Britain in 1707.

== History ==
Somerset County was founded in the Province of Maryland in 1666 and was named after Mary Somerset, the sister-in-law of Cecil Calvert, 2nd Baron Baltimore. The county did not have a flag initially. In 1693, Charles Calvert, 3rd Baron Baltimore, commissioned the creation and design of a flag for the county. The following year, King William III of England granted Somerset County a royal warrant to use the "King's Colours" as their county flag. The King's Colours became the flag of Great Britain in 1707 but the Kings of England had used it as a personal flag to symbolise the personal Union of the Crowns of England and Scotland. The Indian in the center represented the local Native Americans who had a large number of settlements in the Somerset County area.

On the year of the flag's adoption, the colonists in Somerset County started to use it as a naval ensign. In the following years, it appears that the flag fell into disuse. In 1958, members of the Olde Princess Anne Days Committee and some Somerset County Commissioners discovered a facsimile of the flag in the house of Joshua Miles, who permitted a reproduction to be created. Later, in the 1990s, the flag inspired the design of the flag of the University of Maryland as the Eastern Shore campus was located in Somerset County.

== See also ==
- Flag of Somerset
