= John Slezer =

German-born military engineer and artist

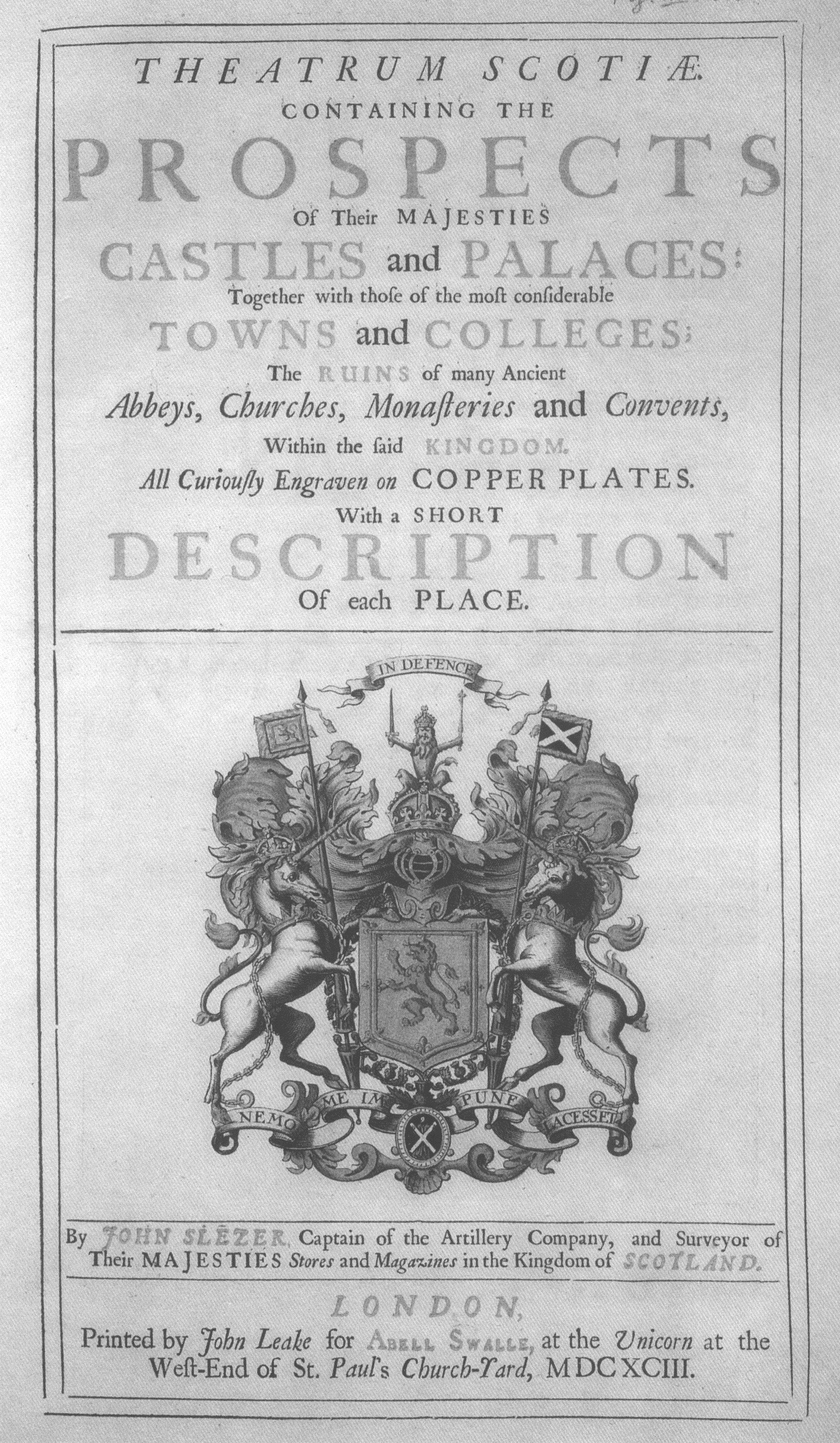
Title page of the Theatrum Scotiae, 1693

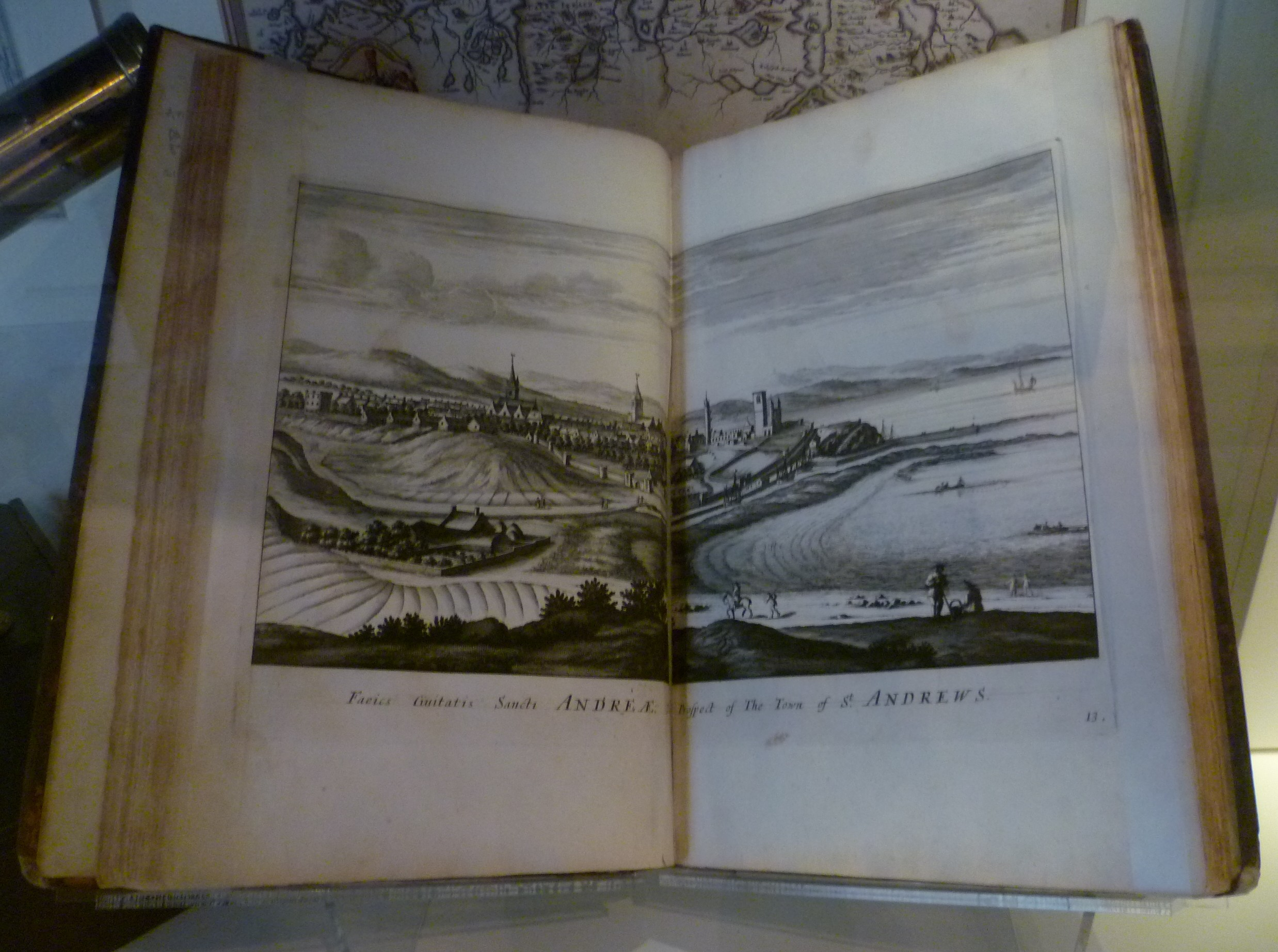
A copy of Slezer's work in the National Museum of Scotland

John Slezer (before 1650 – 1717) was a German-born military engineer and artist.

== Life ==
Slezer was born in a German-speaking region of Europe, possibly the upper Rhineland. He may have spent his early years in military service to the House of Orange.

He arrived in the Kingdom of Scotland in 1669, and was appointed Surveyor of his Majesties Stores and Magazines, which involved compiling detailed surveys of the country's fortifications. He is best known for his Theatrum Scotiae, a series of engravings of views of castles, abbeys, towns, and seats of the nobility he encountered whilst travelling throughout Scotland in his capacity as Captain of the Artillery Company.

He was raised to the rank of Captain in 1688 and imprisoned later that year as a supporter of King James VII, following the latter's deposition in favour of William III and Mary II, but was released the following year. He published the first volume of Theatrum Scotiae in 1693, but sales were poor and he applied to the Government for a grant to proceed with a continuation of the work that was to be called Scotia Ilustrata. This never materialised, however, and increasing financial difficulties forced Slezer to spend the last years of his life in the Holyrood Abbey sanctuary to avoid debtors' prison.

He died on 24 June 1714.

== Family ==
He married Jean Straiton, a native of Dundee.

== See also ==
- The North Prospect of the City of Edenburgh
