= The North Prospect of the City of Edenburgh =

Late 17th century engraving print made by John Abraham Slezer

- Artist: John Slezer
- Dimensions: 49.20 x 109.50 cm
- Location: Scottish National Gallery of Modern Art

The North Prospect of the City of Edenburgh is an engraving by John Abraham Slezer that was probably drafted around 1690 and published 1718–19. This depiction of the city of Edinburgh was transferred from Scottish National Portrait Gallery to Scottish National Gallery of Modern Art (Modern Two).

== About ==
This engraving, which is one of the early artistic impressions of the city, is a view from the Calton Hill. This treasured print showcases the architectural marvels of Edinburgh. Slezer started a creative endeavour to document Scotland's towns, castles, and ruins. After his short imprisonment for his Jacobite support of James II, he was permitted to start printing in 1693. Sir Robert Sibbald, the cartographer royal for Scotland, provided text to go with Slezer's drawings. This work was initially intended for the second publication of Slezer's The Ancient and the Present State of Scotland. Poor sales and lack of support from the Scottish Parliament for Theatrum Scotiae pushed Slezer into debt. He died penniless in 1717. This work was posthumously published in the 1718 edition of Theatrum Scotiae.

== Description ==
The etching depicts a detailed journey from the Castle to Holyrood Palace through the Royal Mile. The viewer is led from the castle down the High Street and through the towering lands, beneath the Netherbow Port in the direction of the Canongate Tolbooth, passing by St Giles' Cathedral and the Tron Church. Before arriving at the Palace of Holyrood, the viewer may observe the attractive gardens of the posh mansions here. This view demonstrates how prosperous the area around Edinburgh's High Street used to be.
