= Reform Group (Ireland) =

The Reform Group
- Formation: 1998 (28 years ago)
- Type: Advocacy group
- Leader: Murt O'Sullivan
- Website: https://reformgroup.wordpress.com

The Reform Group is an organisation based in Dublin that seeks to have Ireland rejoin the Commonwealth of Nations.

== History ==
The group was launched in 1998 as The Reform Movement shortly after the successful referendum ratifying the Good Friday Agreement and describing itself as a coalition of "new unionists for the new millennium".

A number of its founders, such as Anne Holliday, had been members of the anti-republican group, New Consensus. At its launch, the group called for:

- support for the creation of the British–Irish Council as set out in the Good Friday Agreement
- the extension of full British citizenship rights to those who sought it in Ireland
- the appointment of a senior official in the Department of the Taoiseach with special responsibility for minority affairs
- legislative change so that five of the 11 Senators currently nominated by the Taoiseach would be drawn from minority groups in Ireland
- State support for Ulster Scots speakers
- increased resources for the Garda Síochána to help it tackle crime and terrorism

The group claims to be a voice for "alternative viewpoints" of "Irishmen and Irishwomen who do not fit in the seamless definition" of nationalist or unionist. It has previously voiced support for citizens of Ireland being given the right to apply for British passports. The group has also expressed views that are critical of the status of the Irish language.

In May 2010, the group launched a book called, Ireland and the Commonwealth: Towards Membership. Speaking at the launch were independent Senator David Norris, writer Mary Kenny and Trinity College professor Robert Martin, all of whom stated their support for Ireland rejoining the Commonwealth. It was described in The Phoenix magazine as a "ridiculous Unionist ginger group".

== Logo ==
At its inception and for some years afterwards, the "badge" or logo of The Reform Group was Saint Patrick's Cross, a white flag with a red saltire. This was a controversial choice of symbol as the authenticity of the symbol as one representing Ireland has often been debated.
