= Flags of the English Interregnum =

Command flag used by generals at sea, dating to 1652–54.

There were a variety of flags flown by ships of the Commonwealth during the Interregnum of 1649–1660.

At sea, royalist ships continued to fly the Union Jack of 1606, while on 22 February 1649 the Council of State decided to send the parliamentary navy an order (signed by Oliver Cromwell on 23 February) that "the ships at sea in service of the State shall onely beare the red Crosse in a white flag" (viz., the flag of England). On 5 March 1649 the Council further ordered "that the Flagg that is to be borne by the Admiral, Vice-Admiral, and Rere-Admiral be that now presented, viz., the Armes of England and Ireland in two severall Escotcheons in a Red Flagg, within a compartment." A sole surviving example of a naval flag following this description is kept by the National Maritime Museum at Greenwich, others having fallen victim to the destruction of Commonwealth symbols at the Restoration of Charles II. Scotland was formally united with England in 1654. According to Perrin (1922), the saltire of Scotland did not reappear on naval flags of the Commonwealth until 1658.

In 1658 Cromwell's personal standard as Lord Protector became the "Standard for the General of his Highnesse fleet", while the Cross-and-Harp jack was replaced by the "Protectorate Jack", consisting of the royal Union Flag with the addition of the Irish Harp at the centre.

== Flags of the Commonwealth ==
A flag used by the Commonwealth Parliamentary Navy and privateers beginning on 22 February 1649.

Flag described as "the Parliament Jack", following a decision of the State Council on 23 February 1649: "And that upon the Sterne of the Shipps there shall be the Red Crosse in one Escotcheon, and the Harpe in one other, being the Armes of England and Ireland, both Escotcheons joyned according to the pattern herewith sent unto you.", replaced in 1658.

Standard of the Lord Protector from 1653 to 1659.

The jack used by the Commonwealth after 1658, replaced the impaled St George's Cross and Irish harp.)

== See also ==
- List of English flags
- Coat of arms of England
