= Flag of Taunton, Massachusetts =

City of Taunton
- Proportion: 2:3
- Adopted: October 21, 1774; 252 years ago
- Design: A red field with the words "Liberty and Union" near the bottom and the Union Jack in the top left corner
- Designed by: Sons of Liberty

The city flag of Taunton, Massachusetts, also known as the Taunton Flag and the Liberty and Union Flag, was first adopted in 1774 and has since been adopted as the flag of Taunton. It consists of the Red Ensign with the flag of Great Britain in the canton, defaced with the words "Liberty and Union" across the lower portion.

== History ==
The flag was first adopted on 21 October 1774 after the Sons of Liberty had forced out American Loyalists from Taunton. The Reverend Caleb Barnum proposed a plan for a symbol of opposition to the British government and the governor of the Province of Massachusetts Bay. In commemoration, the Patriots erected a liberty pole, 112 feet (34 m) high, outside of the Taunton Courthouse and the house of Tory Loyalist lawyer Daniel Leonard. On it, they raised the Red Ensign with the words "Liberty and Union" sewn onto it. The design of the Union Jack on the ensign predated the union of Great Britain and Ireland and did not include Saint Patrick's Saltire to represent Ireland.

The Taunton flag was one of the first flags used within the Thirteen Colonies to express dissension against the Crown. It also initially symbolised underlying loyalty to the Crown as the Union Flag was viewed as the King's Colours. The popularity of the flag grew due to the Boston Evening-Post publishing it in a story. The wife of William McKinstry, the only Loyalist permitted to remain, expressed her disdain for the Taunton flag, and in response women Patriots dragged her from her house and forced her to march in front of the liberty pole where it was flying. A later version of the Taunton Flag was created including the "Liberty and Union" slogan on a Union Flag.

== Present day ==
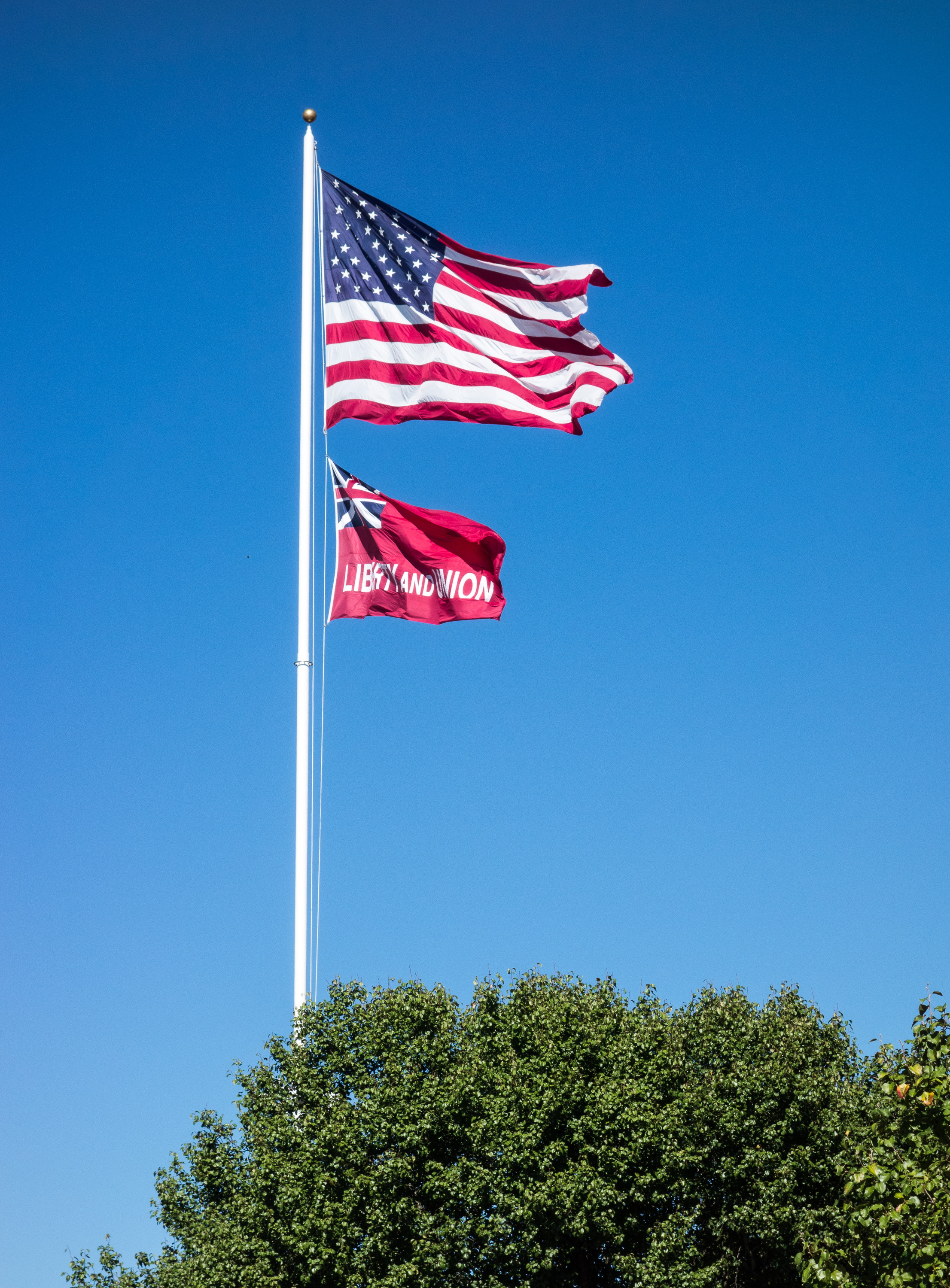
The flag of Taunton flies beneath the flag of the United States over Taunton Green in September 2016.

The current flag was adopted as the city flag of Taunton by a resolution of the Taunton City Council on October 19, 1974. It is not known what the original flag looked like; the current design is based on an incomplete contemporary newspaper description.

The flag is flown in Taunton Green Historic District alongside the flag of the United States. It also flies in front of Taunton City Hall and other city buildings, as well as many private homes.

It was also symbolically raised outside the Old Colony History Museum in Taunton on the city's 350th anniversary.

Each autumn, Taunton's Old Colony History Museum holds a Liberty and Union Festival to commemorate the events of October 1774, and to celebrate the Taunton Flag. The 250th anniversary of the flag raising was observed in October 2024.

In addition to being the official flag of Taunton, Massachusetts, the Taunton flag is also the official flag of Weymouth, New Jersey. Their reasoning for using the flag is that "its historical period is correct, it keeps alive an ancestor to our Stars and Stripes, and because it is always in production and therefore, cheap". Like in Taunton it can be seen flying outside Weymouth's town hall.

== See also ==
- Continental Union Flag
- George Rex Flag
