= George Rex Flag =

American Revolutionary War flag

The accepted version of the George Rex Flag as described by several sources

The George Rex Flag was a protest flag used in the Province of New York at the start of the American Revolutionary War. The flag was adopted following the passage of the Quebec Act in 1774 whereby French Canadian Roman Catholics were granted emancipation and Roman Catholicism was adopted as the state church of the Province of Quebec. Though it is not known exactly what the design of the flag was, the commonly accepted version consisted of either an altered Red Ensign or Blue Ensign with the words "George III Rex (Latin: King) and the Liberties of America. No Popery".

== Background ==
The Province of New York had the Church of England as the established church in the colony. Following the passage of the Quebec Act granting Catholic emancipation and freedom of religion to Catholics in Quebec at the start of the American Revolutionary War, New Yorkers were angry about it, as they feared it would spread Catholicism around British North America, particularly in the Anglican colonies. American Patriot organisations, as a result, designed the George Rex Flag as a symbol of protest against the act and Catholicism. They raised it on a liberty pole in the centre of New York at a meeting outside the New York Royal Exchange before spreading it throughout the colony. A number of British Army officers and customs officers happened upon the meeting, but it continued peacefully after the meaning of the meeting and the George Rex Flag was explained to them. The flag was also flown from the Liberty Tree on Boston Common.

The flag's design came from the New York colonists stating loyalty to King George III, who, as Supreme Governor of the Church of England, had expressed concern about Catholic Emancipation as a violation of his coronation oath. New York patriots viewed the monarchy as a symbol of unification initially until the Battle of Lexington, when people such as Isaac Low made claims that the King had violated his oath by allowing Catholicism in Quebec to try breaking the New York citizenry's loyalty to the crown. Despite this, the flag was then adopted as the unofficial flag of the Province of New York during the war on those grounds. This continued until 1777 when George Washington and the Continental Congress adopted the Grand Union Flag to use as a unified flag for all of the states involved.

== Gallery ==
Blue version

Reverse

Red version

Reverse

== See also ==
- Continental Union Flag
- Flag of Taunton, Massachusetts
