= Taunton Green Historic District =

Historic district in Massachusetts, United States

- U.S. National Register of Historic Places
- U.S. Historic district
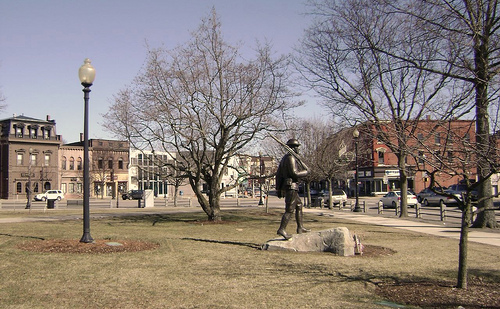
- Taunton Green, looking east toward Main Street

- Location within Massachusetts Location within the United States
- Location: Taunton, Massachusetts
- Coordinates: 41°54′8″N 71°5′40″W
- Area: 50 acres (20 ha)
- Built: 1830
- Architect: Multiple
- Architectural style: Late 19th and 20th Century Revivals, Late Victorian
- MPS: Taunton MRA
- NRHP reference No.: 85000547
- Added to NRHP: March 1, 1985

The Taunton Green Historic District encompasses the core area of the historic 19th-century commercial downtown business district of Taunton, Massachusetts. It is centered on the town green, laid out in the 1740s, which now serves at the intersection between U.S. Route 44, Massachusetts Route 140, and Route 138. The district was listed on the National Register of Historic Places in 1985.

== History ==
The early commercial center of the city of Taunton was southeast of the present center, at the confluence of the Taunton and Mill Rivers. In the 18th century early industry in the form of sawmills and gristmills developed on the Mill River. The Taunton Green was given to the town in 1743 as a militia training ground, and it is also where an early meetinghouse was built. Originally 88 acres (36 ha) in size, it is now much reduced by the surrounding development. Early commercial buildings were mostly of wood-frame construction, of which a few survive.

Taunton Green has historically the gathering place for troops headed to war. Monuments stand on the Green to honor soldiers of all the wars in which local citizens have participated.

"Tauntonians" gathered on the Green on October 21, 1774, to raise the Taunton Flag with its distinctive "Liberty and Union" motto. The flag was hoisted on a 112-foot liberty pole in defiance of King George III. The flag flies on the Green to the present day.

A fire in 1859 destroyed many buildings east of the green, and inaugurated more significant growth of brick buildings in the following decades.

Since 1914 the Green has been the site of the city's annual holiday light display which attracts visitors from throughout the area, giving Taunton the nickname of "The Christmas City."

In July 2004, the historic Templar's Hall (c. 1850) and Cohannet Block (1870) (commonly referred to as the Seeley Building) located on the corner of Taunton Green and Weir Street were destroyed by an arsonist.

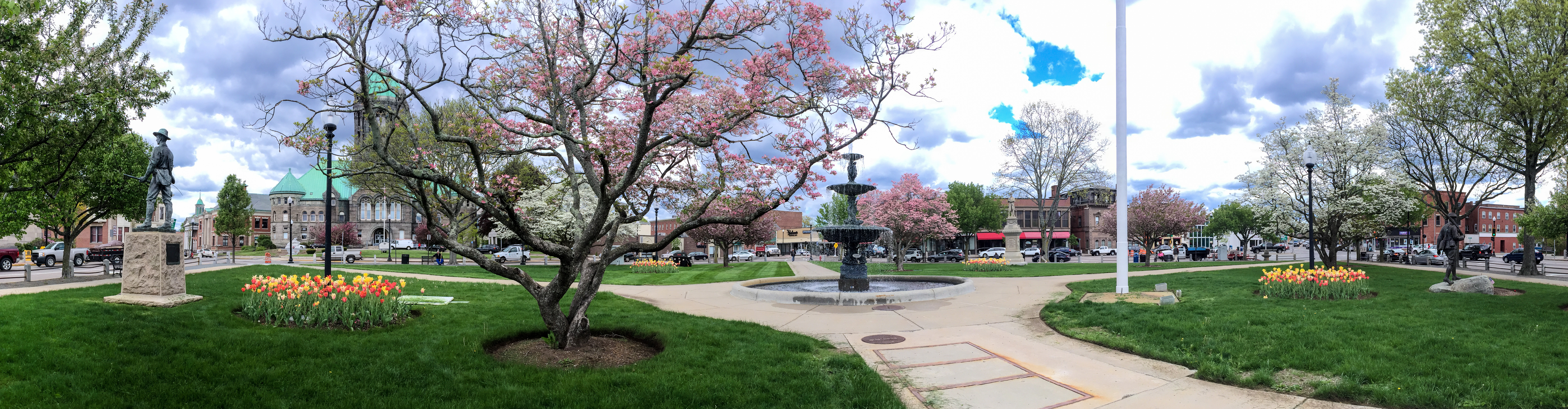
Daffodils and flowering trees brighten Taunton Green (Massachusetts) on a spring day

== Description ==
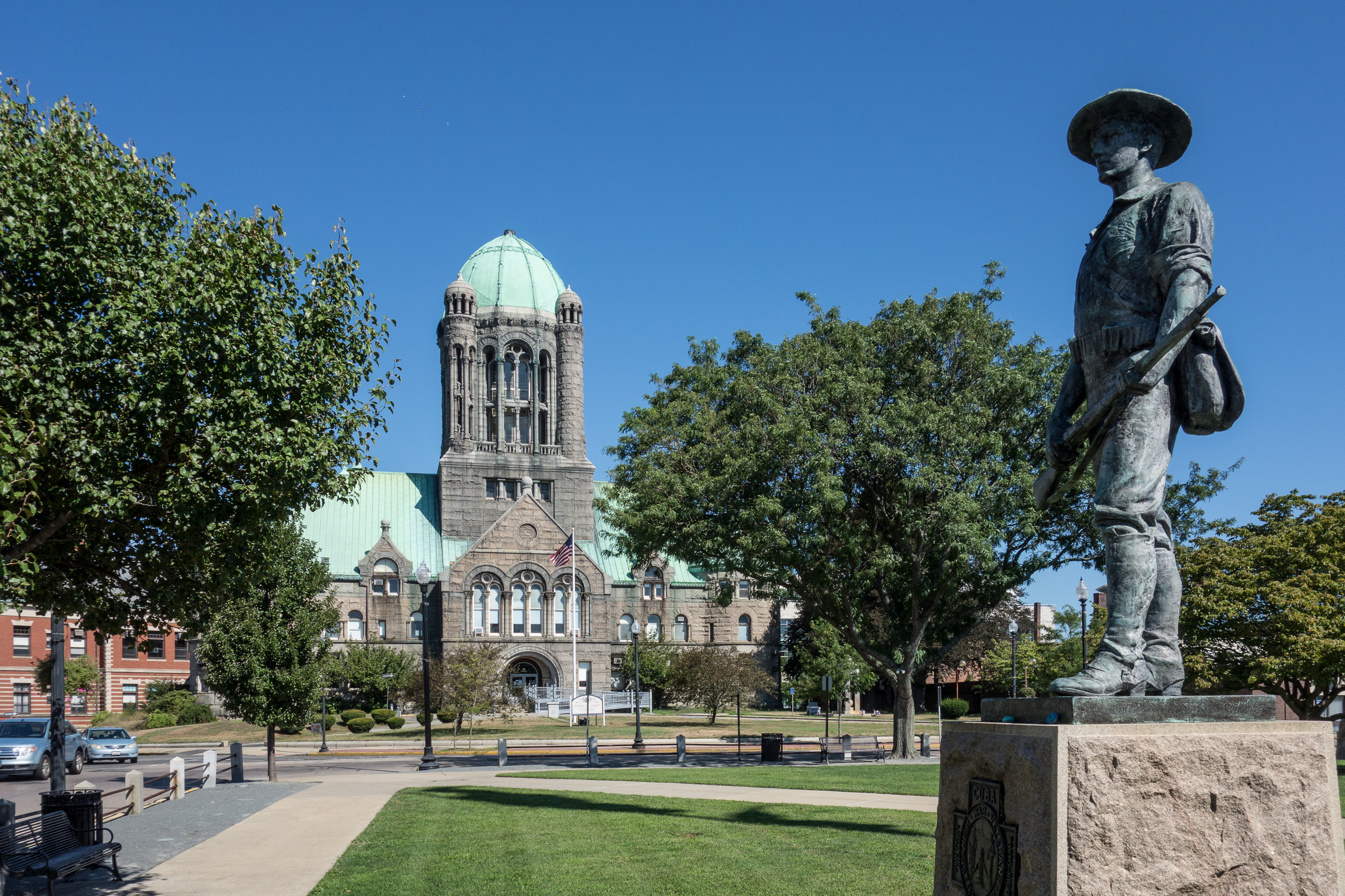
County Courthouse and The Hiker statue

The historic district is centered on the roughly square green, and includes most of the buildings facing the green on the flanking streets. It excludes the Bristol County Courthouse Complex, which is located on the north side of the green. It extends for a short way along Broadway to the north and Main Street to the east.

Monuments on the Green honor soldiers of all the wars in which local citizens have participated. Among them is The Hiker, one of fifty copies of a statue by Theo Alice Ruggles Kitson. It commemorates the American soldiers who fought in the Spanish–American War, the Boxer Rebellion and the Philippine–American War. The statue was cast by the Gorham Manufacturing Company in nearby Providence, Rhode Island.

== Contributing properties ==
(partial listing)

- Taunton Green (historic town common)
- J.R. Tallman & Co, Inc. (1913), 11-12 Court Street
- Crocker Building (1898), 4 Court Street
- Boys & Girls Club of Taunton (1913), 31 Court Street
- 43 Taunton Green (1831), current facade added in 1893
- Dunbar Block (c. 1830), 44-49 Taunton Green
- Union Block (1860), 1-37 Main Street
- Bank Blocks (c. 1855), 4, 5 & 9 Taunton Green
- Taylor Building (1889), 10-14 Taunton Green
- Jones Block (1874), 5-29 Broadway
- Donovan Building (c. 1900), 28 Broadway

== Properties with separate NRHP Listings ==
- United States Post Office (1932), 37 Taunton Green

== See also ==
- National Register of Historic Places listings in Taunton, Massachusetts
- Taunton City Hall
- Church Green

== Gallery ==
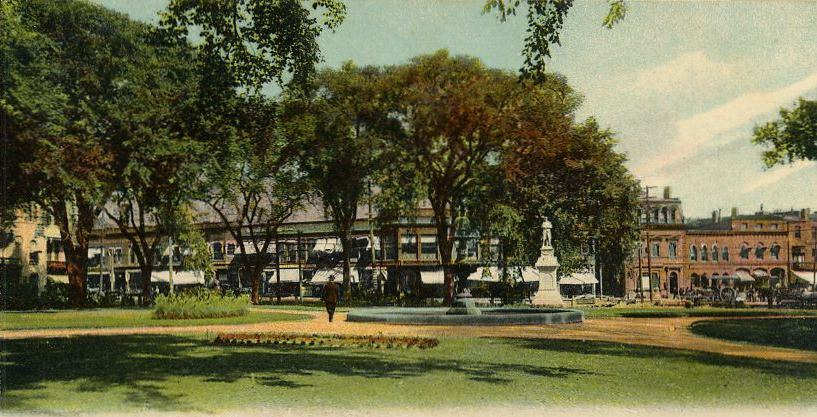
Taunton Green in c. 1905

Historic view of Taunton Green with Bristol County Superior Courthouse in the distance

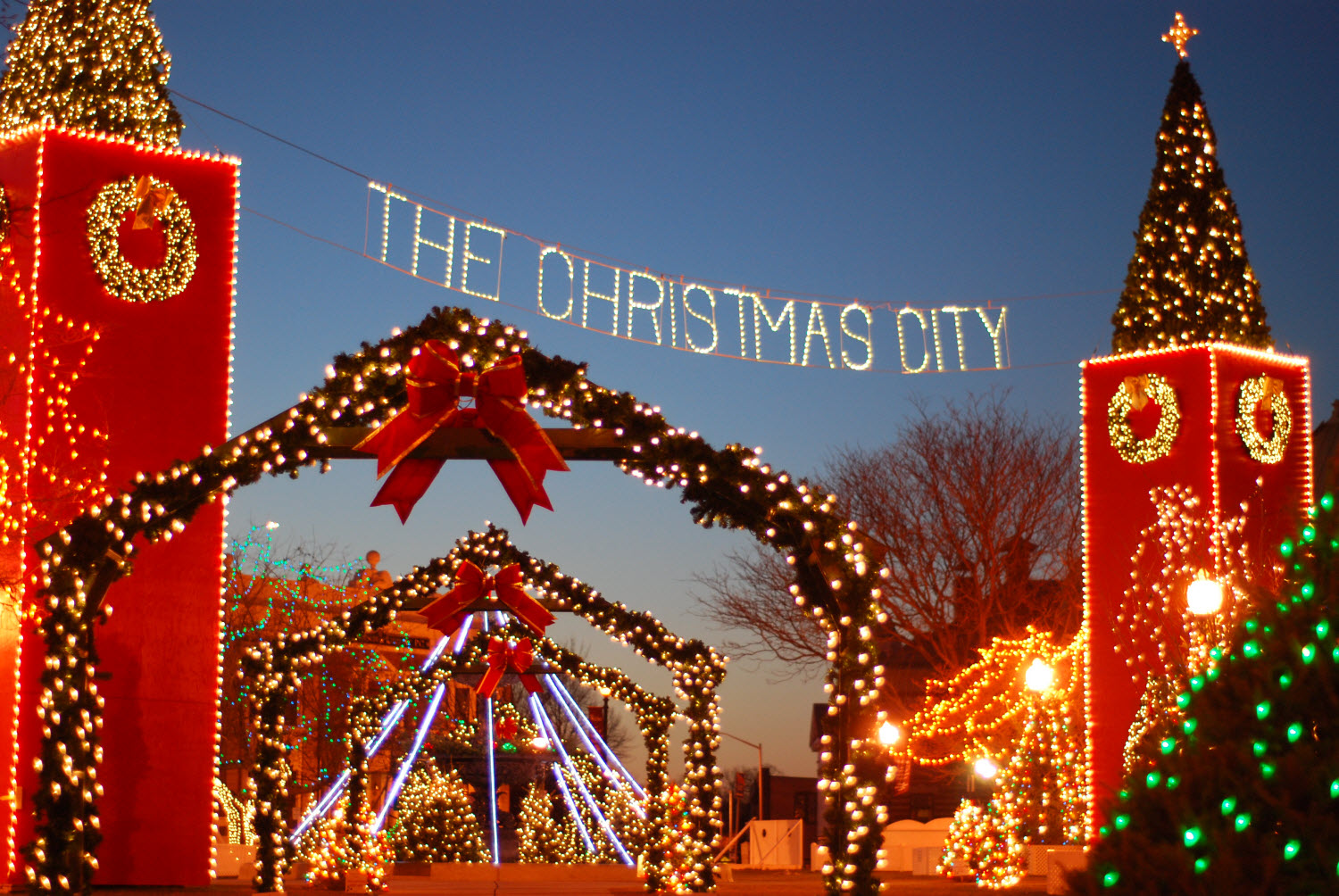
Annual holiday light display on Taunton Green

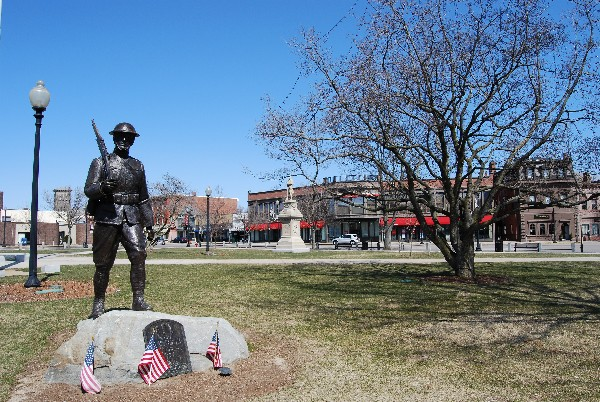
World War I memorial on Taunton Green

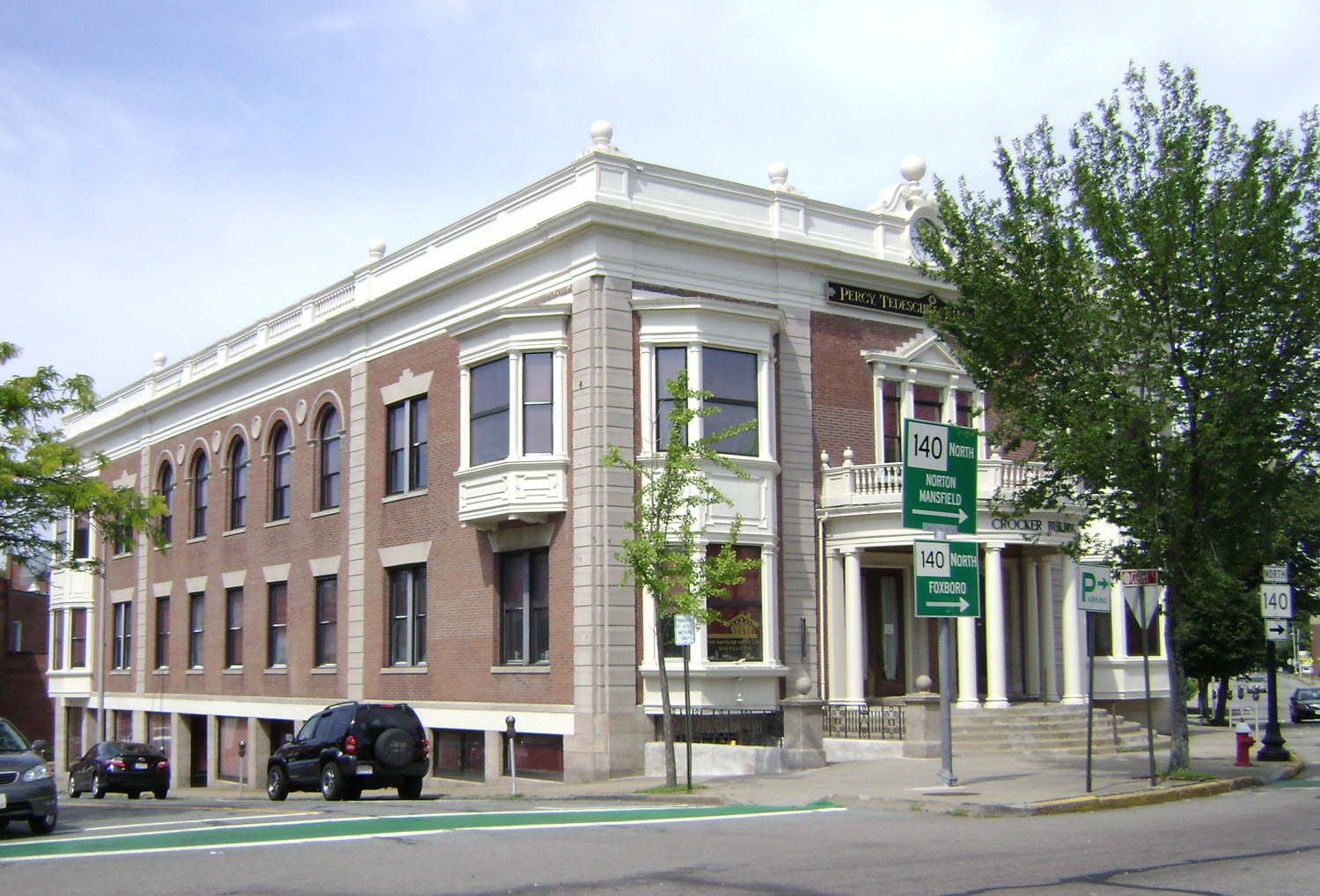
Crocker Building

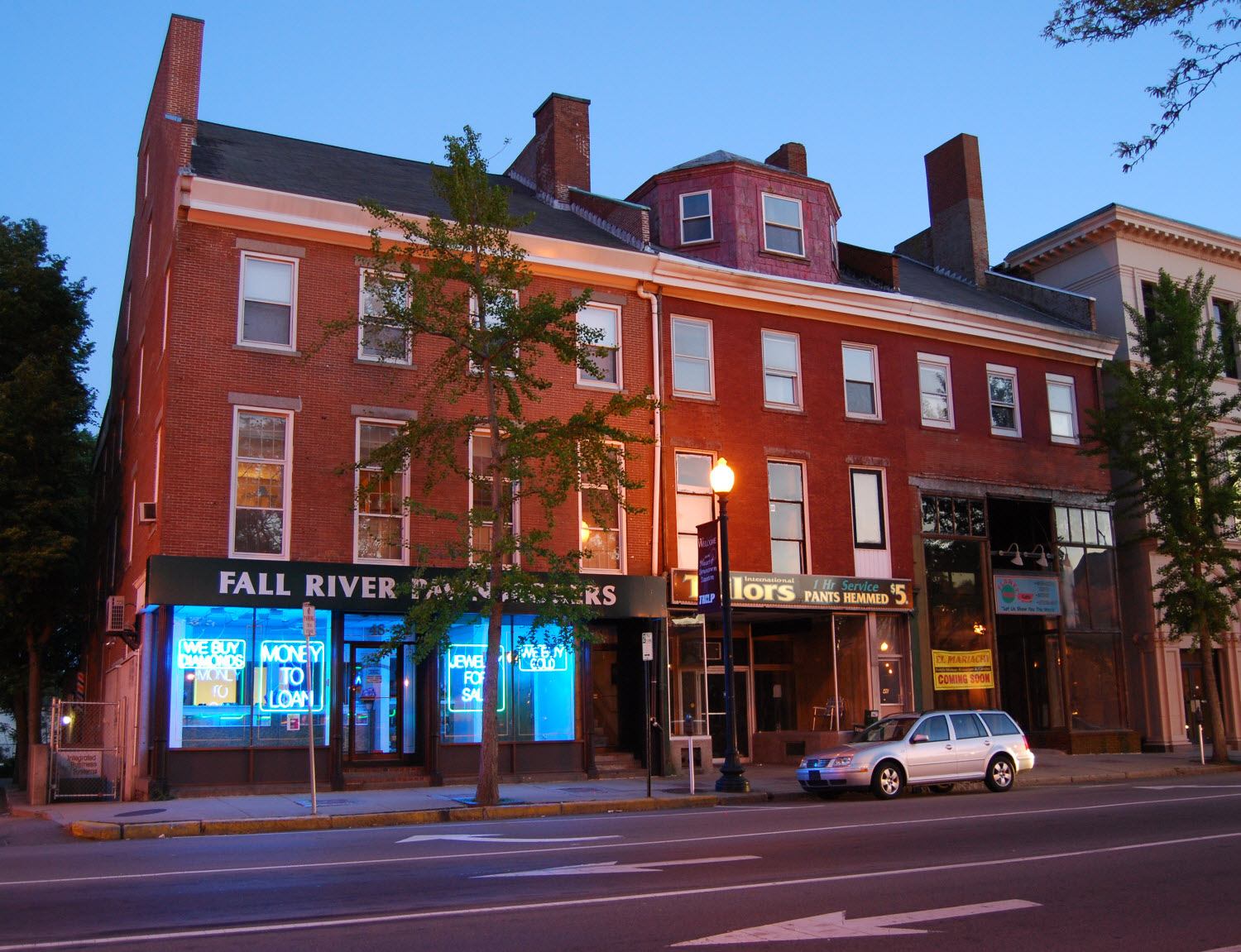
Dunbar Block

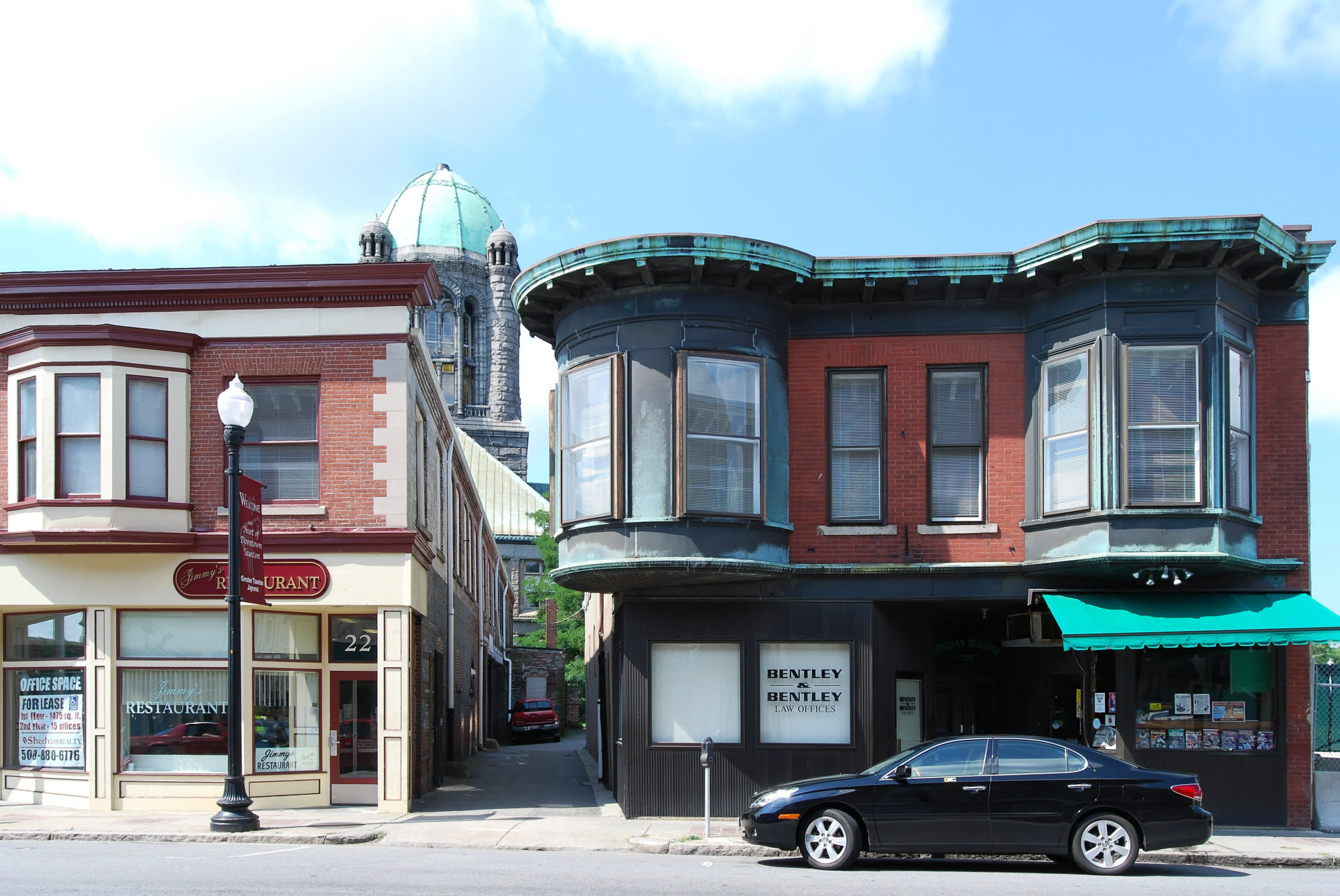
Donovan Block

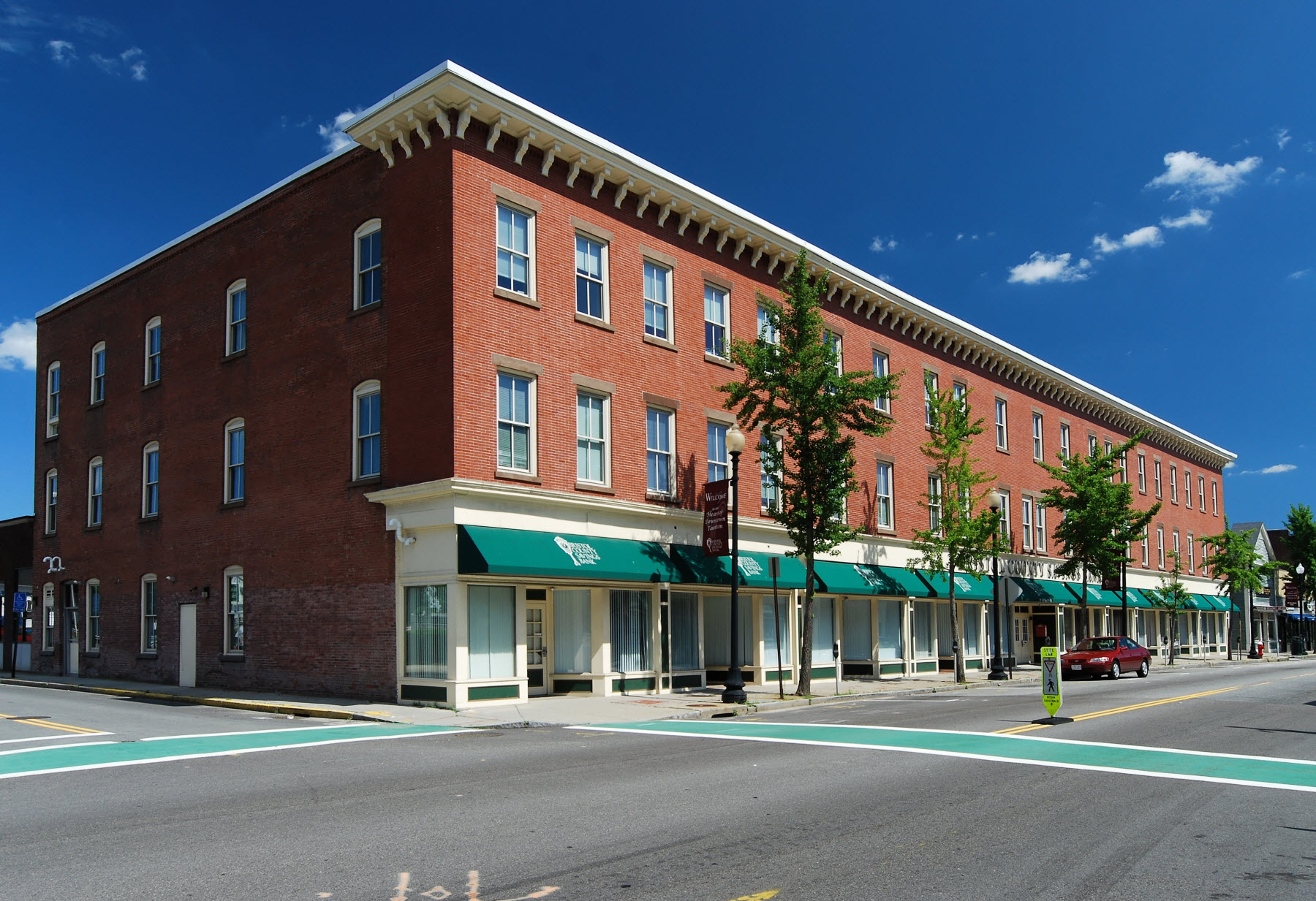
Jones Block

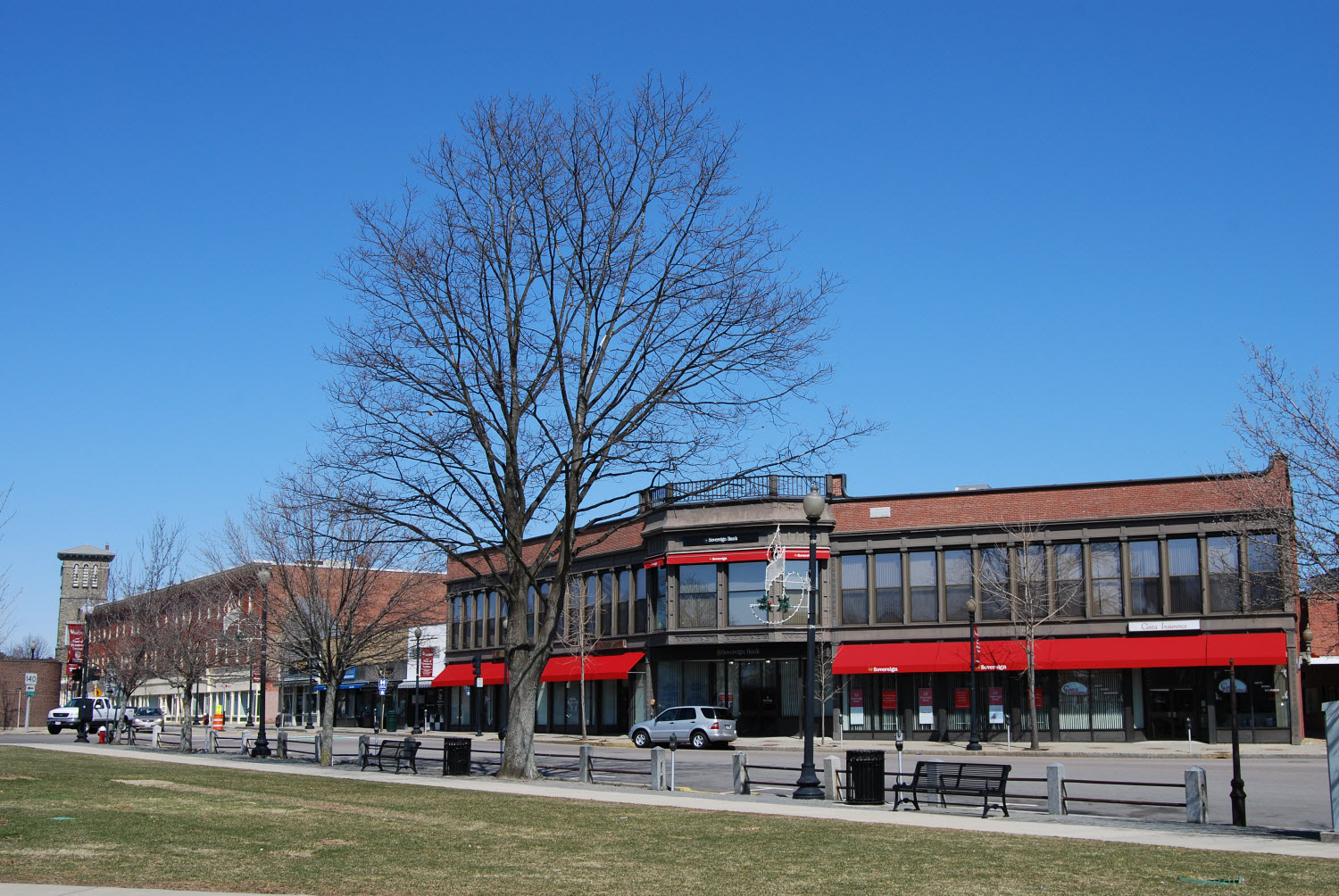
Taylor Block

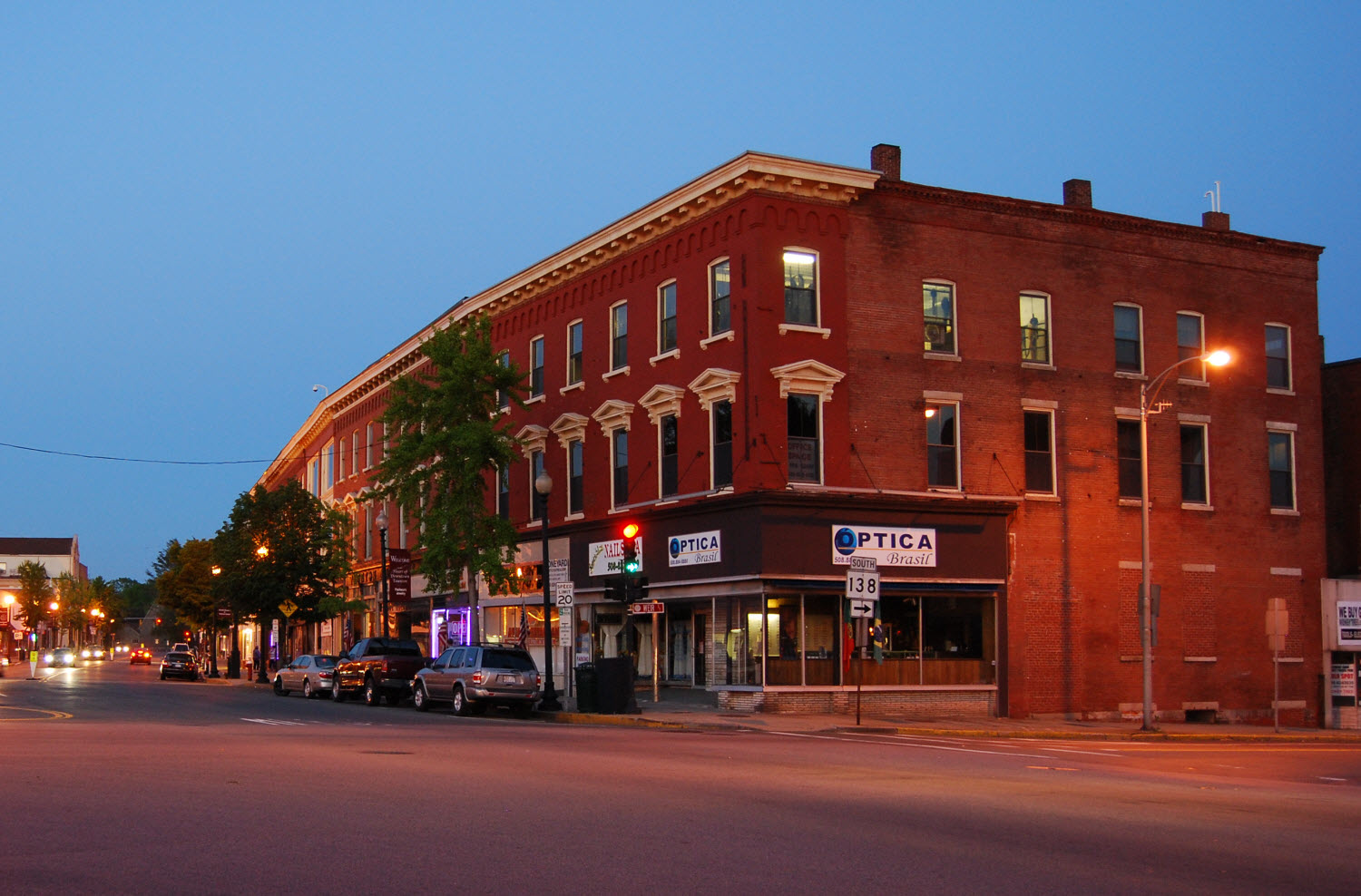
Union Block

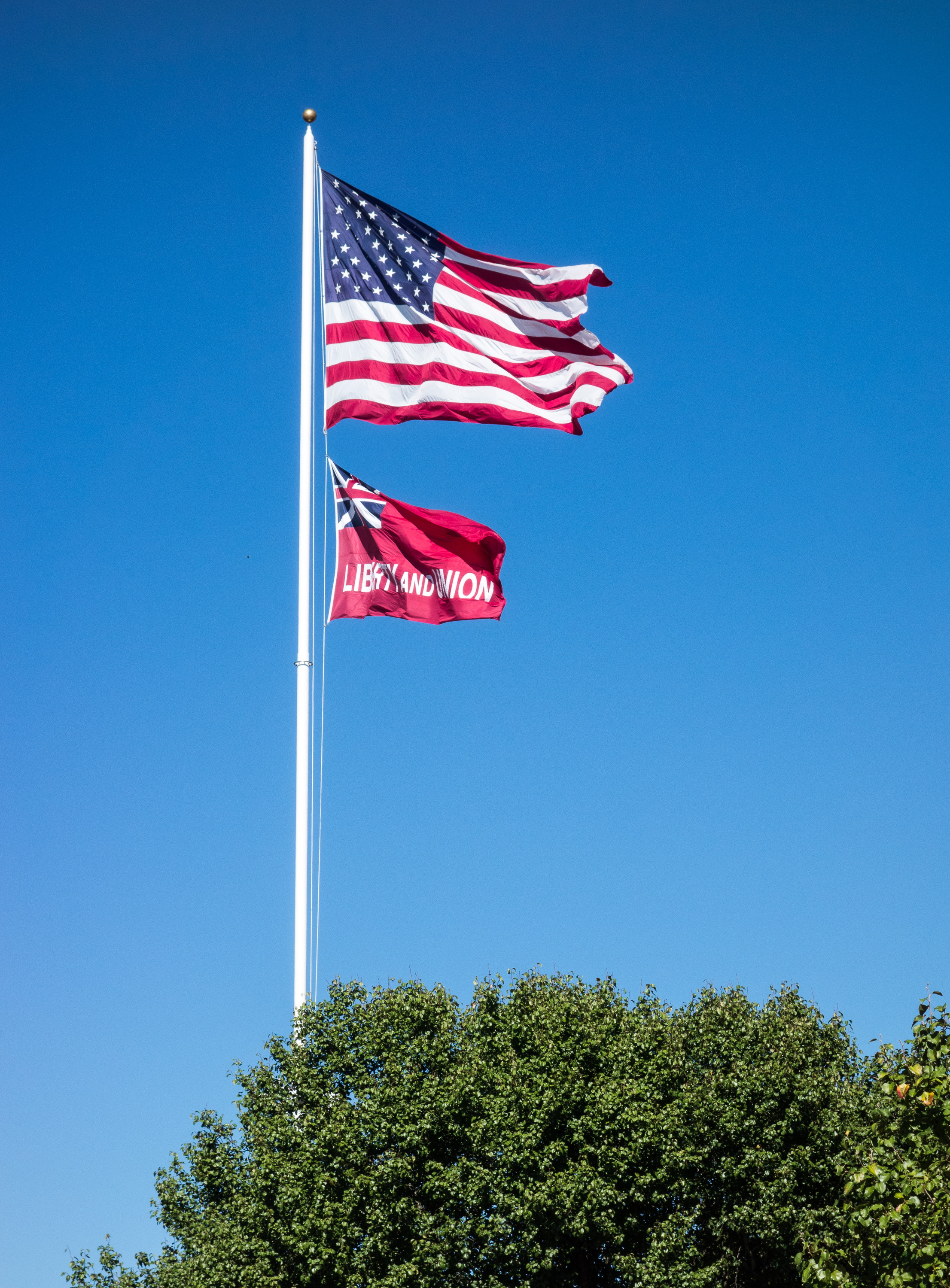
The flag of Taunton flies beneath the flag of the United States over Taunton Green
