= United States Post Office–Taunton Main =

- US Post Office-Taunton Main
- U.S. National Register of Historic Places
- U.S. Historic district – Contributing property
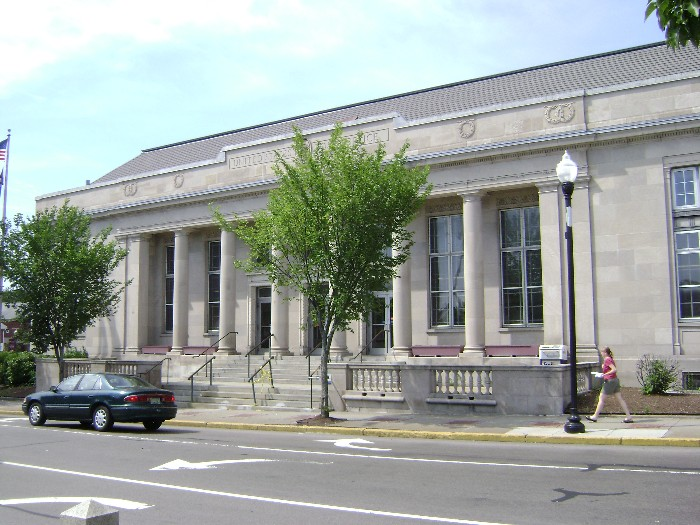

- Location within Massachusetts Location within the United States
- Location: 37 Taunton Green, Taunton, Massachusetts
- Coordinates: 41°54′6″N 71°5′41″W
- Built: 1930
- Built by: J.J. Whelan, Inc., Contrs.
- Architect: Office of the Supervising Architect under James A. Wetmore
- Architectural style: Classical Revival
- Part of: Taunton Green Historic District (ID85000547)
- NRHP reference No.: 86003476

Significant dates
- Added to NRHP: October 19, 1987
- Designated CP: March 1, 1985

US Post Office-Taunton Main is the main post office facility in the city center of Taunton, Massachusetts. Built in 1930 with funding from the Works Progress Administration, it is a fine example of Classical Revival architecture. The building was listed on the National Register of Historic Places in 1987; it was included in the Taunton Green Historic District in 1985.

== Description and history ==
The main Taunton Post Office is located on the west side of Taunton Green, bounded on the south by Cohannet Street. It is a single-story limestone-faced Classical Revival building with a truncated hip roof. The prominent features of its main facade are a series of monumental Tuscan columns, behind which the recessed entry is located. The columns, along with paired square pilasters at the outside of the recessed area, support an entablature, above which a dentillated cornice surrounds the building. The interior has a narrow but wide public lobby space, with terrazzo marble flooring and a high marble wainscoting.

The building was designed by the Office of the Supervising Architect under James A. Wetmore, and was built in 1931–32 with funding from the Works Progress Administration. It replaced a Richardsonian Romanesque building dating to the late 19th century, and was built on land once belonging to Samuel Crocker, one of Taunton's leading businessmen.

== See also ==
- National Register of Historic Places listings in Taunton, Massachusetts
- List of United States post offices
