= Lists of naval flags =

Naval flags, both naval jacks and naval ensigns, are a subset of maritime flags flown by naval forces.

There are several lists of naval flags, organised by present or former country:

== Current countries ==
- Australia - List of Australian flags § Royal Australian Navy
- Bangladesh - List of Bangladeshi flags § Military
- Belgium - List of Belgian flags § Military
- Croatia - List of Croatian flags § Maritime flags
- Estonia - List of Estonian flags § Navy
- Hungary - List of Hungarian flags § Naval flags
- India - List of Indian flags § Navy
- Ireland - List of flags of Ireland § Naval service
- Japan - List of Japanese flags § Self-Defense Force and Imperial Army/Navy
- Latvia - List of Latvian flags § Military flags
- Lithuania - List of Lithuanian flags § Military flags
- Norway - List of Norwegian flags § Flags of the Navy
- Poland - List of Polish naval and maritime flags, List of Polish flags § Navy
- Russia - List of Russian navy flags
- Thailand - List of flags of the Royal Thai Armed Forces § Royal Thai Navy
- United Kingdom - List of British flags § Naval service
- United States - Flags of the United States Armed Force § Maritime flags

== Former countries ==
- USSR - List of USSR navy flags
- Yugoslavia - List of Yugoslav flags § Military flags

== See also ==
- Maritime flag
- Naval jack
- Naval ensign
- Flag of the United States Navy
- Blue Ensign
- Red Ensign
- White Ensign

== List of flags ==
- Category:Lists and galleries of flags
- Lists of lists
- List of Bangladeshi flags
