= Ensign of the Russian Navy =

Blue saltire on a white field

Russian naval ensign
- Use: Naval ensign and war banner
- Proportion: 2:3
- Adopted: 1712 (Note: Officially, the right of Russian warships to fly St. Andrew's flag was announced in 1703.)–1917 as the naval ensign of the Imperial Russian Navy (Navy of the Russian Republic in 1917); 1917–1922 as the naval ensign of Whites' naval forces (including Wrangel's fleet); Since December 29, 2000, as the naval ensign and war banner of the Russian Navy
- Version of 1992–2000
- Use: Naval ensign
- Proportion: 1:1.5
- Adopted: July 21, 1992 (Note: Ensign raising ceremonies took place on July 26, 1992.)
- Relinquished: December 29, 2000

The Russian naval ensign, also known as St. Andrew's flag (Russian: Андреевский флаг; Russian pre-reform: Андреевскій флагъ), was the naval ensign of the Navy of the Russian Empire (from 1712 to 1917) and of the Navy of the Russian Republic (1917), and is the naval ensign of the Navy of the Russian Federation since 1992, and the naval ensign and war banner of the Russian Navy since 2000.

The flag has a white background with two blue diagonal bands, forming a saltire, called St. Andrew's Cross. The ratio of the flag's width to its length is 2:3, the width of the blue band is 1:10 the length of the flag.

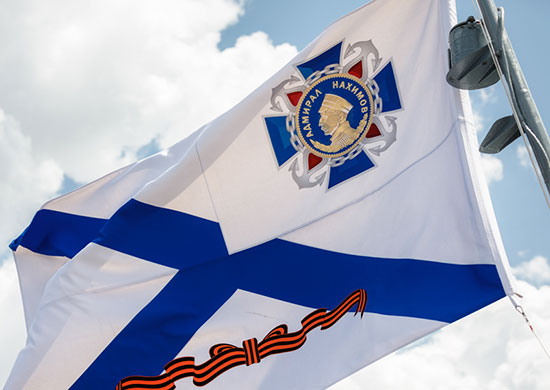
The naval ensign of the Russian cruiser Moskva with the Guards ribbon and the badge of the Order of Nakhimov; Sevastopol, 22 July 2016

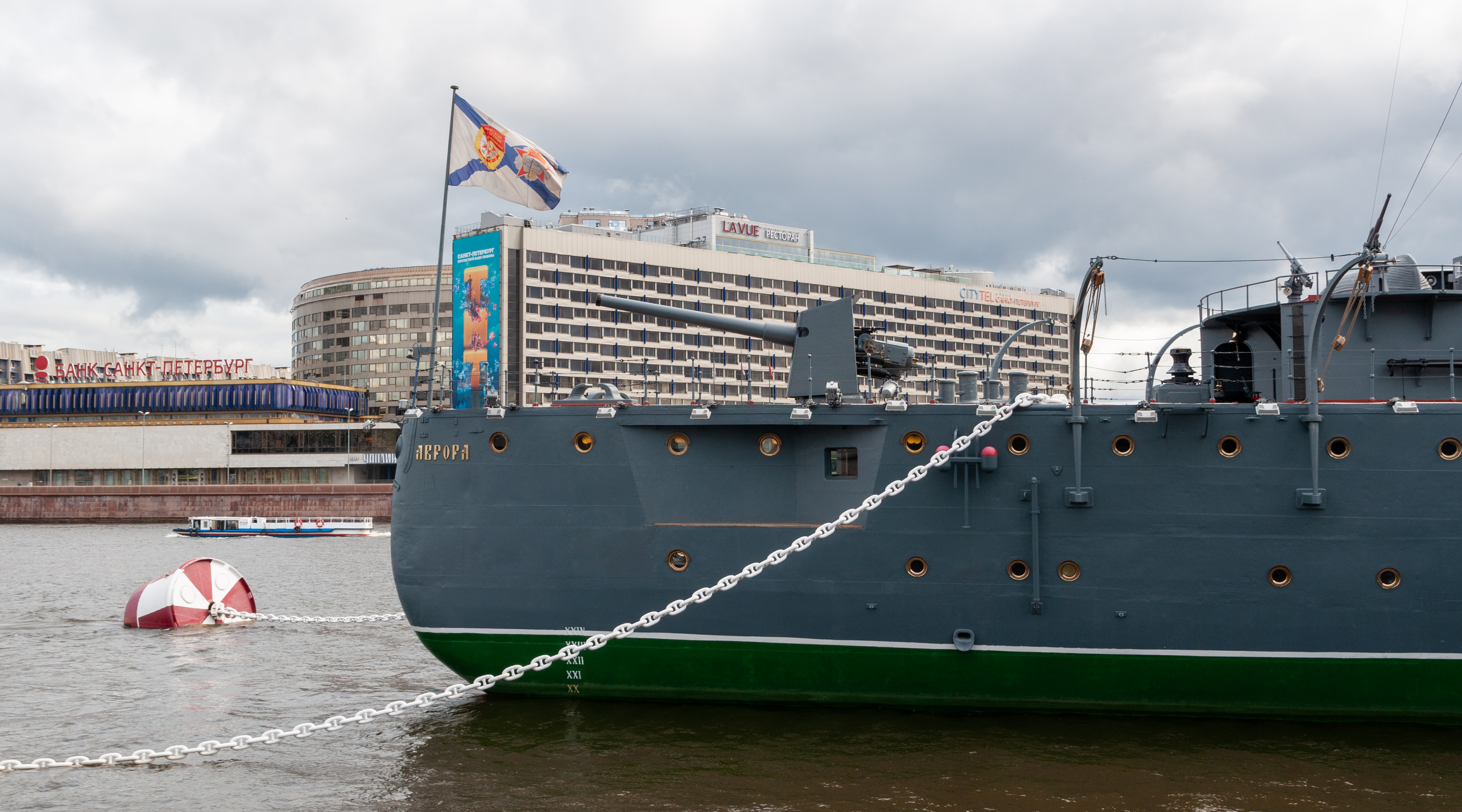
The naval ensign with the badges of the Orders of the Red Banner and of the October Revolution flown from the stern of the Russian cruiser Aurora; Saint Petersburg, 3 August 2019

The Guards ribbon and images of orders awarded to the ship can be added to the naval ensign.

== History ==
In 1698, Peter I the Great established the first Russian medal, the Order of St. Andrew, which is to be awarded for military exploits and public service. When he became tsar, he started to devise a flag for the Russian Navy. The symbolism of the flag is a tribute to his father, Alexei Mikhailovich Romanov, who established a special flag for the first Russian naval ship, the three-masted sailing frigate Oryol.

In 1699, on the draft of the tsar's instruction to Yemelyan Ukraintsev concerning protocol issues of the Russian embassy to the Ottoman Empire there is a white-blue-red three-striped flag crossed by a diagonal blue St. Andrew's cross.

In 1700, the flags of admiral (white), vice admiral (blue) and counter admiral (red) were introduced; in the canton (the shaft's upper corner) placed the image of St. Andrew's flag on a three-striped background.

Officially, the right of Russian warships to fly St. Andrew's flag was announced after the occupation of Kotlin Island in 1703. Since then, the flag with St. Andrew's cross has been used as a symbol of Russia's access to the four seas—the White, Baltic, Azov and Caspian.

In 1705, a drawing of a three-striped St. Andrew's flag was placed in a book by Carolus Allard, published in Holland.

Since 1709 St. Andrew's cross on a white field was placed in the cantons of naval flags.

In 1712, the final version of the ensign for the fleet's main forces (the middle part of the squadron) and ships in solo voyage—St. Andrew's flag of white colour with a blue (cyan) cross reaching to the cloth's corners was adopted.

From 1692 to 1712 Peter I personally drew eight proposed flags that have consistently been taken into the Navy. Description of the flag's final version by Peter I:

The flag is white, across it there is St. Andrew's blue cross, with which he baptized Russia.

Original text (orthography and font are also original):

Флагъ бѣлый, поперекъ этого имѣется синій Андреевскій крестъ, коимъ Россію окрестилъ онъ.

Modern Russian:

Флаг белый, поперёк этого имеется синий Андреевский крест, коим Россию окрестил он.

Blue and red flags with St. Andrew's flag in the cantons were abolished in 1732–1743, 1764–1797 (finally abolished in 1865).

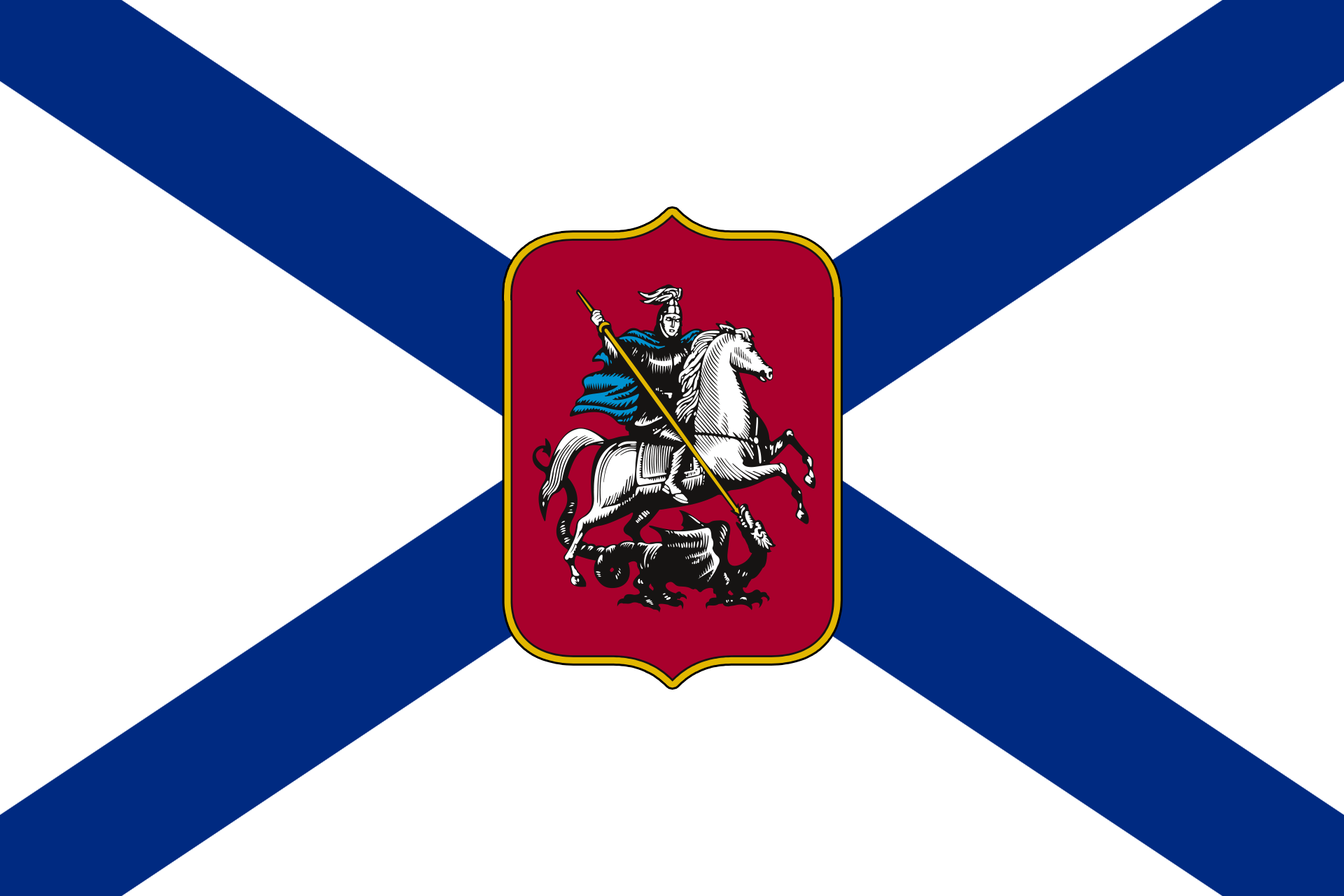
St. George's ensign of the Imperial Russian Navy

In 1819, St. George's ensign was established as a reward flag—St. Andrew's flag with the image of St. George placed on a red shield in the centre. It was awarded to the ship of the line Azov (1827) and the brig Merkurii (1829). In 1837, St. George's warflag—St. George's ensign measuring 4 ft 1 in by 4 ft 0 in—was introduced to reward distinguished naval depots. (Note: The naval depot (Russian: флотский экипаж, romanized: flotskiy ekipazh, lit. 'naval crew') was an Imperial Russian Navy unit whose personnel served on naval ships assigned to this unit.) It was awarded to the 12th Naval Depot, to which the ship of the line Azov was assigned. In 1856, from the 29th to the 45th Naval Depots were awarded St. George's warflags with the inscription "For the Defence of Sevastopol from 13 September 1854 to 27 August 1855."

St. Andrew's flag was cancelled by the decree of the All-Russian Congress of the Navy of December 1 [O.S. November 18] 1917. During the Russian Civil War St. Andrew's flag was hoisted on the White Navy's ships.

After the October Revolution in Russia, the Russian naval ensign was changed, but it was used by Whites' naval vessels up to 1924. The flag of St. Andrew was reintroduced in the Russian Navy in 1992 by the decree of Boris Yeltsin from 21 July, and is still used today.

== See also ==
- Alexander Gordon (general)
- Patrick Gordon
- Thomas Gordon (Royal Scots Navy officer)
- Flag of Scotland, similar but white on blue
- List of Russian navy flags
- List of Soviet navy flags
- Marsaxlokk, fishing village on Malta with a similar flag
