= Naval flag =

Naval flag may refer to:

- Civil ensign
- Maritime flag
- Naval ensign
- Naval jack

== See also ==
- Lists of naval flags
