= Andrés Iduarte =

Andrés Iduarte Foucher (Note: In this Mexican name, the surname is Iduarte and the second or maternal family name is Foucher.) (May 1, 1907 – April 16, 1984) was a distinguished Mexican essayist and member of the Mexican Academy of Language.

== Biography ==
Andrés Iduarte Foucher was born on May 1, 1907, in Villahermosa, Tabasco, then known as San Juan Bautista. As a result of the arrival of the Mexican Revolution conflict to Tabasco in 1914, his family moved temporarily to the cities of Ciudad del Carmen, Campeche, and Mérida, before turning back to San Juan Bautista once order was reestablished in the city; this experience would be later put down by Iduarte into an autobiographical book entitled Niño, child of the Mexican Revolution (Un niño en la Revolución Mexicana). In 1919, his family moved to Mexico City as a consequence of his sister Eloísa's health problems, who got Spanish flu. In Mexico City he continued his studies at Dr. Hugo Topf College and at the Mexican College (Colegio Mexicano); by 1922, he enrolled in high school at the National Preparatory School (Escuela Nacional Preparatoria) where he studied till 1925. In 1926, he enrolled in Law School at the National University. Being influenced by José Vasconcelos' ideas, he promoted the autonomy of the National Autonomous University of Mexico.

Between 1928 and 1930, Andrés Iduarte travelled to Paris and he joined the Latinamerican Student Association (Asociación de Estudiantes Latinoamericanos, AGELA) where he met other Latin American personalities such as Carlos Quijano, Miguel Ángel Asturias, César Vallejo, Gustavo Machado, Eduardo Machado, Manuel Ugarte and Gabriela Mistral. In 1930, just barely 23 years old, he became History Professor at the National Preparatory School and he codirected the National University Magazine (Revista de la Universidad Nacional) He continued his studies at the Central University of Madrid, Spain, and became Secretary of the Hispano-American University Federation, a member of the Scholar University Federation, and Secretary of the Iberoamerican Division of the Athenaeus of Madrid. He lived there for six years; there he supported the republican cause before the Spanish Civil War, in which he actively participated in the trenches.

From 1939, Andrés Iduarte became Hispano-American Literature Professor at Columbia University, where he got his doctoral degree, remaining there till 1952.

In 1952, he was designated General Director of the National Institute of Fine Arts (Instituto Nacional de Bellas Artes, INBA) in Mexico; there he had among his fellow associates important artists such as Andrés Henestrosa, Celestino Gorostiza, José Durón and Pedro Ramírez Vázquez, who were chairmen of the Literature, Theatre, Music and Architecture Departments, respectively. In 1955, he was dismissed of his duties by then president Adolfo Ruíz Cortines, for allowing the Soviet flag to be laid upon Frida Kahlo's coffin at her funeral, as willed by her beliefs. From 1961, Iduarte returned to Columbia University where he eventually became emeritus professor.

Among the recognitions he obtained, was the First Award of the Martí's Pro-Centennial Commission in Essay written by Foreigners in Havana, 1951, on his work Martí, Writer (Martí, escritor) On July 17, 1978, the Juárez Autonomous University of Tabasco and the state government of Tabasco awarded him with the Silver Juchiman for Arts.

Andrés Iduarte was married twice to the same woman, Graciela Frías Amescua, though they never had any children. On April 16, 1984, Andrés Iduarte died in Mexico City.

== Works ==
- El libertador Simón Bolívar (1931)
- Homenaje a Bolívar (1931)
- Moral Problem of Mexican Youth (El problema moral de la juventud mexicana, 1932)
- En el fuego de España (1933)
- Pláticas hispanoamericanas (1934)
- Veinte años con Rómulo Gallegos (1934)
- Martí, escritor (1944), doctoral dissertation from Columbia University.
- México en la nostalgia (1944)
- Sarmiento: a través de sus mejores páginas (1949)
- Niño, child of the Mexican Revolution (Un niño en la Revolución Mexicana, 1951)
- Island without Poison (La isla sin veneno, 1954), conference given at Universidad de Oriente on October 16, 1954
- Sarmiento, Martí y Rodó (1955)
- Gabriela Mistral, santa a la jineta (1958)
- Don Pedro de Alba y su tiempo (1963)
- Tres escritores mexicanos (1967)
- El mundo sonriente (1968)
- Preparatoria (1983)
- Lunes de El Nacional (1970)
- Diez estampas mexicanas (1971)
- Hispanismo e hispanoamericanismo (1983)
- Semblanzas (1984)
