= List of flags of the Soviet Union =

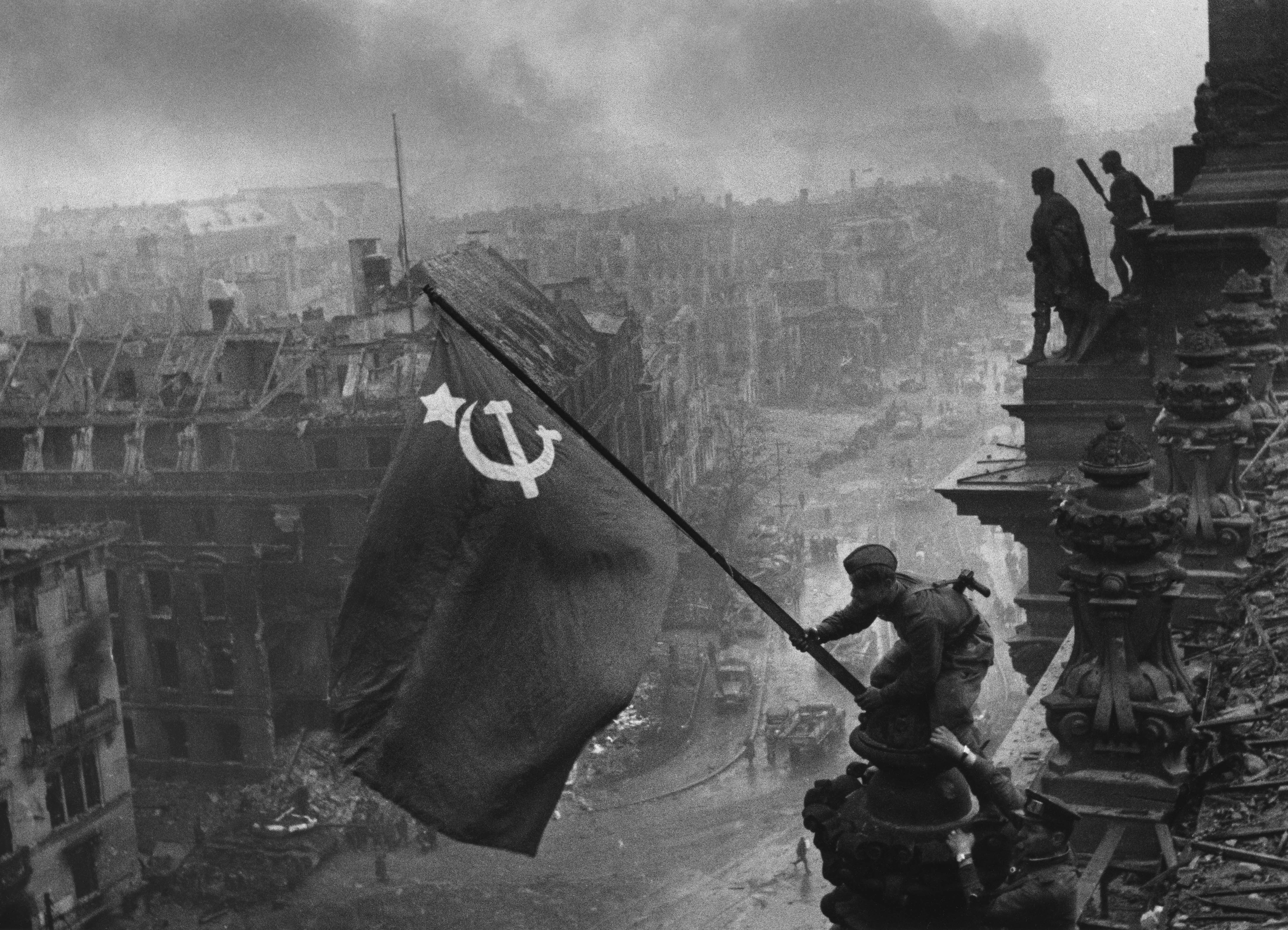
Raising a Flag over the Reichstag (1945) by Yevgeniy Khaldey, depicting Soviet soldiers placing the Soviet flag over the Reichstag

This is list of flags related to the Soviet Union, as in use from 1922 to 1991.

== National ==
Flag	Date	Use	Description
	1922–1923	State flag of the Soviet Union	A red field with the state emblem of the Soviet Union in the center, fimbriated in white.
	1923–1924	State flag of the Soviet Union	A red field with a gold hammer, sickle and star within a golden fimbriated canton.
	1924–1936	State flag of the Soviet Union	A red field with a gold hammer, sickle and star on the canton, as approved in 1924.
	1936–1955	State flag of the Soviet Union	A red field with a gold hammer, sickle and star on the canton, as approved in the 1936 Constitution.
	1955–1991	State flag of the Soviet Union	A red field with a gold hammer, sickle and star on the canton, as approved by the Presidium of the Supreme Soviet in 1955.
	1980–1991	Reverse of the state flag	A red field, as approved by the Presidium of the Supreme Soviet in 1980. Rarely utilized in practice.

== Military ==
Flag	Date	Use	Description
	1945	The Victory Banner	A red field with a grey hammer, sickle and star, with an inscription reading "150th Rifle Order of Kutuzov 2nd class Idritsa Division 79th Rifle Corps 3rd Shock Army 1st Belarusian Front". Flown over the Reichstag on May 1st 1945.
	1964–1991	Flag of the Supreme Commander-in-Chief of the Soviet Armed Forces	A red field with the state emblem of the Soviet Union in the center, fimbriated in white. The position was usually held by the general secretary and, after 1990, the President.
	1964–1991	Flag of the Minister of Defence.	A white field with two light blue stripes, one off center, the other on the lower edge, with the state emblem of the Soviet Union in the center, fimbriated in white.

=== Navy ===
Flag	Date	Use	Description
	1935–1991	Naval ensign of the Soviet Navy	A white field with a blue horizontal stripe on the lower edge, consisting of a red star near the hoist, and a red hammer and sickle near the fly. Approved in 1935, modified in 1950.
	1932–1991	Naval jack of the Soviet Navy	A red field with a white hammer and sickle within a white fimbriated red star. Approved in 1932, confirmed in 1935, modified in 1964
	1935–1991	Naval ensign of the Soviet Border Troops	A green field with the Soviet naval ensign in the canton. Approved in 1935, confirmed in 1964.

=== Air Force ===
Flag	Date	Use	Description
	1924–1991	Flag of the Soviet Air Forces	A blue field with golden rays linked to an off center gold circle representing the sun, consisting of a red star with a gold hammer and sickle, below it wings and a propeller. Approved in 1924, officially adopted by the VVS in 1967.

== Republics ==
=== Russian SFSR ===
Flag	Date	Use	Description
	1917–1918	State flag of the Russian SFSR	A red field. Used during the initial revolutionary era.
	1918	State flag of the Russian SFSR	A red field with the pre-reform Russian full name of the republic in white.
	1918–1925/1937	State flag of the Russian SFSR	A red field with a traditionally-stylized abbreviation of the republic in gold within a golden fimbriated canton. Approved in 1918 by the All-Russian Central Executive Committee, replaced in the Russian Constitution of 1925, though still remained in use until 1937.
	1925–1937	State flag of the Russian SFSR	A red field with an abbreviation of the republic in gold on the canton, as approved per the Russian Constitution of 1925.
	1937–1954	State flag of the Russian SFSR	A red field with an abbreviation of the republic in gold on the canton, approved per the Russian Constitution of 1937.
	1954–1991	State flag of the Russian SFSR	A red field with a light blue stripe along the hoist, with a gold hammer, sickle and star on the canton of the red field, as approved by the Presidium of the Russian Supreme Soviet in 1954.
	1981–1991	Reverse of the state flag	A red field with a light blue stripe along the hoist, as approved by the Presidium of the Russian Supreme Soviet in 1981. Rarely utilized in practice.
	1991	State flag of the Russian SFSR	A tricolour of white, blue, and red. Approved by the Presidium of the Russian Supreme Soviet on 22 August 1991, and adopted on 1 November 1991. Use continued upon independence until standardization in 1993.

==== Governmental ====
Flag	Date	Use	Description
	1991	Standard of the President of the Russian SFSR	A red field with the Russian coat of arms without the star, below an abbreviation of the republic in gold.

=== Ukrainian SSR ===
Flag	Date	Use	Description
	1917–1918	Flag of the Ukrainian People's Republic of Soviets	A red field with the traditional Ukrainian flag in the canton.
	1918	Flag of the Ukrainian Soviet Republic	A red field.
	1919–1929	State flag of the Ukrainian SSR	A red field with a Russian abbreviation of the republic in gold within a golden fimbriated canton. Approved in 1919.
	1929–1937	State flag of the Ukrainian SSR	A red field with an abbreviation of the republic in gold on the canton, as approved in the Ukrainian Constitution of 1929.
	1937–1949	State flag of the Ukrainian SSR	A red field with an abbreviation of the republic in gold on the canton, with a hammer and sickle above it, as approved per the Ukrainian Constitution of 1937.
	1949–1991	State flag of the Ukrainian SSR	A red field with a light blue horizontal stripe on the lower edge, with a gold hammer, sickle and star on the canton of the red field, as approved by the Presidium of the Ukrainian Supreme Soviet in 1949. Continued use as a co-national flag post-independence until 1992.
	1981–1991	Reverse of the state flag	A red field with a light blue horizontal stripe on the lower edge, as approved in 1981. Rarely utilized in practice.
	1991	Co-national state flag of the Ukrainian SSR	A bicolour of blue and gold. Adopted through the declaration of independence on 24 August 1991. Use continued upon independence.

=== Byelorussian SSR ===
Flag	Date	Use	Description
	1919	Flag of the Socialist Soviet Republic of Byelorussia	A red field with an abbreviation of the republic in gold within a golden fimbriated canton.
	1919–1920	Flag of the SSR Litbel	A red field.
	1919–1927	State flag of the Byelorussian Soviet Socialist Republic	A red field with an abbreviation of the republic in gold within a golden fimbriated canton. Approved in 1919.
	1927–1937	State flag of the Byelorussian Soviet Socialist Republic	A red field with an abbreviation of the republic in gold on the canton, as approved in the Byelorussian Constitution of 1927.
	1937–1951	State flag of the Byelorussian Soviet Socialist Republic	A red field with an abbreviation of the republic in gold on the canton, with a hammer, sickle and star above it, as approved in the Byelorussian Constitution of 1937.
	1951–1991	State flag of the Byelorussian Soviet Socialist Republic	A red field with a white ornamental patterned stripe along the hoist and a green stripe on the lower edge, with a gold hammer, sickle and star on the canton of the red field, as approved by the Presidium of the Byelorussian Supreme Soviet in 1951.
	1981–1991	Reverse of the state flag	A red field with a white ornamental patterned stripe along the hoist and a green stripe on the lower edge, as approved in 1981. Rarely utilized in practice.
	1991	State flag of the Byelorussian SSR	A tricolour of white, red, and white. Adopted on 25 August 1991. Use continued upon independence until 1995.

=== Armenian SSR ===
Flag	Date	Use	Description
	1922–1937	State flag of the Armenian SSR	A red field with an abbreviation of the republic in gold in the canton. Approved through the Armenian Constitution of 1922.
	1922	State flag of the Armenian SSR	A red field with an abbreviation of the republic in gold within a golden fimbriated canton. Based around the design of the Russian SFSR flag.
	1923	State flag of the Armenian SSR	A red field with a Russian abbreviation of the republic in gold within a golden fimbriated canton. Most likely an incorrect Russian reconstruction based on the 1922 flags description.
	1937–1940	State flag of the Armenian SSR	A red field with an abbreviation of the republic in gold on the canton, with a hammer and sickle above it, as approved in the Armenian Constitution of 1937.
	1940–1952	State flag of the Armenian SSR	The 1937 flag, but with the abbreviation modified, approved in 1940.
	1952–1990	State flag of the Armenian SSR	A red field with a blue stripe on the center, with a gold hammer, sickle and star on the canton of the red field, as approved by the Presidium of the Armenian Supreme Soviet in 1952.
	1981–1990	Reverse of the state flag	A red field with a blue stripe on the center, approved in 1981. Rarely utilized in practice.
	1990–1991	State flag of the Armenian SSR	A tricolour of red, blue, and orange. Approved by the Armenian Supreme Soviet on 23 August 1990. Use continued upon independence.

=== Azerbaijani SSR ===
Flag	Date	Use	Description
	1920	State flag of the Azerbaijani SSR	A red field with a white star and crescent in the canton, facing towards the hoist.
	1920–1921	State flag of the Azerbaijani SSR	A red field with a white star and crescent in the canton, facing towards the fly.
	1921–1922	State flag of the Azerbaijani SSR	A red field with an abbreviation of the republic in gold within a golden fimbriated green canton. Approved in the Azerbaijani Constitution of 1921.
	1922–1924	State flag of the Azerbaijani SSR	A red field with gold abbreviations of the republic in two scripts, Latin above and Arabic below, in gold within a golden fimbriated green canton. Approved by the Azerbaijani Central Executive Committee in 1922.
	1924–1927	State flag of the Azerbaijani SSR	A red field with a hammer and sickle near the hoist, with a right facing star and crescent above it, and gold abbreviations of the republic in Latin and Arabic scripts next to them. Approved in 1924.
	1927–1931	State flag of the Azerbaijani SSR	The 1924 flag, but with the Azerbaijani Latin abbreviation modified. Approved through the Azerbaijani Constitution of 1927.
	1931–1937	State flag of the Azerbaijani SSR	A red field with a hammer and sickle near the hoist, with a right facing star and crescent above it, and a gold abbreviation of the republic next to them. Approved through the Azerbaijani Constitution of 1927.
	1937–1940	State flag of the Azerbaijani SSR	A red field with an abbreviation of the republic in gold on the canton, with a hammer and sickle above it. Approved through the Azerbaijani Constitution of 1937.
	1940–1952	State flag of the Azerbaijani SSR	The 1937 flag, but with the Latin abbreviation replaced with Cyrillic, as approved by the Presidium of the Azerbaijani Supreme Soviet in 1940.
	1952–1991	State flag of the Azerbaijani SSR	A red field with a blue horizontal stripe on the lower edge, with a gold hammer, sickle and star on the canton of the red field, as approved by the Presidium of the Azerbaijani Supreme Soviet in 1952.
	1981–1991	Reverse of the state flag	A red field with a blue horizontal stripe on the lower edge, as approved in 1981. Rarely utilized in practice.
	1991	State flag of the Azerbaijani SSR	A tricolour of blue, red, and green, with an eight-pointed white star and crescent in the center. Adopted on 5 February 1991. Use continued upon independence.

=== Georgian SSR ===
Flag	Date	Use	Description
	1921–1937	State flag of the Georgian SSR	A red field with an abbreviation of the republic in gold on the canton. Approved by the Georgian SSR Revolutionary Committee in 1921.
	circa 1922–1937	State flag of the Georgian SSR	A red field with a Russian abbreviation of the republic in gold on the canton. Most likely an incorrect Russian reconstruction based on the 1921 flags description.
	1937–1951	State flag of the Georgian SSR	A red field with an inscription of the republic in gold on the canton. Approved by the All-Georgian Congress of Soviets in 1937.
	1951–1990	State flag of the Georgian SSR	A red field with a light blue canton with red rays around a circle, with a red hammer, sickle and star on the canton, and a light blue stripe along the fly, as approved by the Presidium of the Georgian Supreme Soviet in 1951.
	1981–1990	Reverse of the state flag	A red field with a light blue canton with red rays around a circle, and a light blue stripe along the fly, as approved by the Presidium of the Georgian Supreme Soviet in 1981. Rarely utilized in practice.
	1990–1991	State flag of the Georgian SSR	A crimson field, with a bicolour of black and white in the canton. Approved by the Presidium of the Georgian Supreme Soviet on 14 November 1990. Use continued upon independence until 2004.

=== Uzbek SSR ===
Flag	Date	Use	Description
	1925–1927	State flag of the Uzbek SSR	A red field with abbreviations of the republic in gold, Uzbek above and Russian below, as approved by the Uzbek Central Executive Committee in 1925.
	1927–1929	State flag of the Uzbek SSR	A red field with abbreviations of the republic in gold, Uzbek above, Russian middle, and Tajik below, as approved by the Uzbek Central Executive Committee in 1927.
	1929–1931	State flag of the Uzbek SSR	The 1927 flag, but with the Arabic scripts replaced with Latin, as approved by the Uzbek Central Executive Committee in 1929.
	1931–1934	State flag of the Uzbek SSR	The 1929 flag, but with the Tajik abbreviation removed, as adopted in the Uzbek Constitution of 1931.
	1934–1935	State flag of the Uzbek SSR	The 1931 flag, but with the Uzbek abbreviation modified, as approved in 1934.
	1935–1937	State flag of the Uzbek SSR	The 1934 flag, but with the Uzbek abbreviation modified, as approved in 1934.
	1937–1938	State flag of the Uzbek SSR	The 1935 flag, but with the Uzbek abbreviation changed to a fuller inscription, as adopted in the Uzbek Constitution of 1937.
	1938–1941	State flag of the Uzbek SSR	The 1937 flag, but with the Uzbek inscription modified, as approved in 1938.
	1941–1952	State flag of the Uzbek SSR	The 1938 flag, but with the Uzbek Latin inscription replaced with Cyrillic and the Russian inscription changed to a fuller inscription, as approved by the Presidium of the Uzbek Supreme Soviet in 1941.
	1952–1991	State flag of the Uzbek SSR	A red field with a light blue stripe in the middle, bordered in white, with a gold hammer, sickle and star on the canton of the red field, as approved by the Presidium of the Uzbek Supreme Soviet in 1952.
	1981–1991	Reverse of the state flag	A red field with a light blue stripe in the middle, bordered in white, as approved in 1981. Rarely utilized in practice.
	1991	State flag of the Uzbek SSR	A tricolour of blue, white, and green, split between red stripes, with twelve white stars and a white crescent in the canton. Adopted on 18 November 1991. Use continued upon independence.

=== Turkmen SSR ===
Flag	Date	Use	Description
	1926–1937	State flag of the Turkmen SSR	A red field with a gold hammer, sickle and star on the canton, as approved in the Turkmen Constitution of 1926. Design is similar to the flag of the Soviet Union.
	1937–1940	State flag of the Turkmen SSR	A red field with an abbreviation of the republic in gold on the canton, as approved in the Turkmen Constitution of 1937.
	1940–1953	State flag of the Turkmen SSR	The 1937 flag, but with the Latin script replaced with Cyrillic. Approved by the Presidium of the Turkmen Supreme Soviet in 1940.
	1953–1974	State flag of the Turkmen SSR	A red field with a light blue stripe in the center, with a red stripe within it, as approved by the Presidium of the Turkmen Supreme Soviet in 1953.
	1974–1991	State flag of the Turkmen SSR	The 1953 flag, but with the hammer, sickle, and star moved closer to the hoist, as approved by the Presidium of the Turkmen Supreme Soviet in 1974. Use continued upon independence until 1992.
	1981–1991	Reverse of the state flag	A red field with a light blue stripe in the center, with a red stripe within it, as approved by the Presidium of the Turkmen Supreme Soviet in 1981. Rarely utilized in practice.

=== Tajik SSR ===
Flag	Date	Use	Description
	1929–1931	State flag of the Tajik SSR	A red field with a modified emblem of the Tajik Autonomous SSR in the canton.
	1931–1935	State flag of the Tajik SSR	A red field with an inscription of the republic in gold in the canton. Approved by the Tajik Constitution of 1931.
	1931–1935	State flag of the Tajik SSR	A red field with the inscription of the republic in gold in the canton. Considered a more likely design in contrast to the official description.
	1935–1938	State flag of the Tajik SSR	A red field with inscriptions of the republic in gold on the canton, Tajik above and Russian below, with a hammer and sickle above it. Approved by the Presidium of the Tajik Central Executive Committee in 1935.
	1938–1940	State flag of the Tajik SSR	The 1935 flag, but with the Tajik inscription modified, as approved in 1938.
	1940–1953	State flag of the Tajik SSR	The 1938 flag, but with the Tajik Latin script replaced with Cyrillic, as approved by the Presidium of the Tajik Supreme Soviet in 1940.
	1953–1991	State flag of the Tajik SSR	A red field with white and red stripes on the lower edge, separated by a green stripe, with a gold hammer, sickle and star on the canton of the red field, as approved by the Presidium of the Tajik Supreme Soviet in 1953. Use continued upon independence until 1992.
	1981–1991	Reverse of the state flag	A red field with white and red stripes on the lower edge, separated by a green stripe, approved in 1981. Rarely utilized in practice.

=== Kyrgyz SSR ===
Flag	Date	Use	Description
	1937–1940	State flag of the Kyrgyz SSR	A red field with inscriptions of the republic in gold on the canton, Kyrgyz above and Russian below, as approved in the Kyrgyz Constitution of 1937.
	1940–1952	State flag of the Kyrgyz SSR	The 1937 flag, but with the Kyrgyz Latin script replaced with Cyrillic, as approved by the Kyrgyz Supreme Soviet in 1940.
	1952–1991	State flag of the Kyrgyz SSR	A red field with a blue horizontal stripe on the center, with a small white stripe within, with a gold hammer, sickle and star on the canton of the red field, as approved by the Presidium of the Kyrgyz Supreme Soviet in 1952. Use continued after independence until 1992.
	1981–1991	Reverse of the state flag	A red field with a blue horizontal stripe on the center, with a small white stripe within, as approved in 1981. Rarely utilized in practice.

=== Kazakh SSR ===
Flag	Date	Use	Description
	1937–1940	State flag of the Kazakh SSR	A red field with inscriptions of the republic in gold on the canton, Kazakh above and Russian below, with a hammer and sickle above it, as approved in the Kazakh Constitution of 1937.
	1940–1953	State flag of the Kazakh SSR	A red field with a hammer and sickle near the hoist, and inscriptions of the republic in gold along the fly, Kazakh above and Russian below, as approved by the Kazakh Supreme Soviet in 1940.
	1953–1991	State flag of the Kazakh SSR	A red field with a light blue horizontal stripe near the lower edge, with a gold hammer, sickle and star on the canton of the red field, as approved by the Kazakh Supreme Soviet in 1953. Use continued after independence until 1992.
	1981–1991	Reverse of the state flag	A red field with a light blue horizontal stripe near the lower edge, as approved in 1981. Rarely utilized in practice.

=== Moldavian SSR ===
Flag	Date	Use	Description
	1941–1952	State flag of the Moldavian SSR	A red field with an abbreviation of the republic in gold on the canton, with a hammer and sickle below it, as approved by the Moldavian Supreme Soviet of 1940.
	1952–1990	State flag of the Moldavian SSR	A red field with a green horizontal stripe on the center, with a gold hammer, sickle and star on the canton of the red field, as approved by the Presidium of the Moldavian Supreme Soviet in 1952. Use restored by Transnistria.
	1981–1990	Reverse of the state flag	A red field with a green horizontal stripe on the center, as approved in 1981. Rarely utilized in practice.
	1990	State flag of the Moldavian SSR	A vertical tricolour of blue, yellow, and red, with the republican emblem in the center. Approved by the Moldavian Supreme Soviet on 27 April 1990. Never properly implemented in practice.
	1990	State flag of the Moldavian SSR	A vertical tricolour of blue, yellow, and red. Approved by the Moldavian Supreme Soviet on 12 May 1990.
	1990–1991	State flag of the Moldavian SSR	A vertical tricolour of blue, yellow, and red, with the coat of arms in the center. Approved by the Moldavian Supreme Soviet on 23 June 1990. Use continued upon independence until standardization in 2010.

=== Lithuanian SSR ===
Flag	Date	Use	Description
	1919–1920	Flag of the SSR Litbel	A red field.
	1940–1941 1944–1953	State flag of the Lithuanian SSR	A red field with an abbreviation of the republic in gold on the canton, with a hammer and sickle below it, as approved in the Lithuanian SSR Constitution of 1940.
	1953–1988	State flag of the Lithuanian SSR	A red field with a green horizontal stripe on the lower edge, separated by a white stripe, with a gold hammer, sickle and star on the canton of the red field, as approved by the Lithuanian Supreme Soviet in 1953.
	1981–1988	Reverse of the state flag	A red field with a green horizontal stripe on the lower edge, separated by a white stripe, as approved in 1981. Rarely utilized in practice.
	1988–1990	State flag of the Lithuanian SSR	A tricolour of yellow, green, and red. Approved by the Lithuanian Supreme Soviet on 18 November 1988. Use continued upon independence.

=== Latvian SSR ===
Flag	Date	Use	Description
	1919–1920	Flag of the Latvian Socialist Soviet Republic	A red field with an abbreviation of the republic in gold in the canton. Approved by the Congress of Workers, Landless and Riflemen's Deputies in 1919.
	1940–1941 1944–1953	State flag of the Latvian SSR	A red field with an abbreviation of the republic in gold on the canton, with a hammer and sickle below it, as approved by the Presidium of the Latvian Supreme Soviet in 1940.
	1953–1990	State flag of the Latvian SSR	A red field with wavy white and blue stripes on the lower edge, with a gold hammer, sickle and star on the canton of the red field, as approved by the Presidium of the Latvian Supreme Soviet in 1953.
	1981–1990	Reverse of the state flag	A red field with wavy white and blue stripes on the lower edge, as approved in 1981. Rarely utilized in practice.
	1990	State flag of the Latvian SSR	A carmine red field with a white stripe in the centre. Public displaying decriminalized by the Presidium of the Supreme Council of the Latvian SSR on 29 September 1988, declared the sole official flag on 27 February 1990. Use continued upon independence.

=== Estonian SSR ===
Flag	Date	Use	Description
	1940–1941 1944–1953	State flag of the Estonian SSR	A red field with an abbreviation of the republic in gold on the canton, with a hammer and sickle below it, as approved by the Estonian Supreme Soviet of 1940.
	1953–1990	State flag of the Estonian SSR	A red field with wavy white and blue stripes near the lower edge, with a gold hammer, sickle and star on the canton of the red field, as approved by the Presidium of the Estonian Supreme Soviet in 1953.
	1981–1990	Reverse of the state flag	A red field with wavy white and blue stripes near the lower edge, as approved in 1981. Rarely utilized in practice.

=== Former republics ===
==== Karelo-Finnish SSR ====
Flag	Date	Use	Description
	1940–1953	State flag of the Karelo-Finnish SSR	A red field with inscriptions of the republic in gold on the canton, Finnish above and Russian below, with a hammer and sickle above it. Approved through the Karelo-Finnish Constitution of 1940.
	1953–1956	State flag of the Karelo-Finnish SSR	A red field with light blue and green stripes on the lower edge, with a gold hammer, sickle and star on the canton of the red field, as approved by the Presidium of the Karelo-Finnish Supreme Soviet in 1953. Discontinued upon reintegration into the Russian SFSR.

==== Transcaucasian SFSR ====
Flag	Date	Use	Description
	1925–1936	State flag of the Transcaucasian SFSR	A red field with an abbreviation of the republic in gold on the canton in the form of a semi-circle, with a golden fimbriated red star above it. Approved through the Transcaucasian Constitution of 1925. Discontinued upon the SFSR's separation in 1936.

== Proposed ==
=== Armenian SSR ===
Flag	Date	Proposed Use	Description
	Late 1940s	State flag of the Armenian SSR	Variants of the Armenian tricolour, flipped upside down and red replaced with a brownish-green, incorporating a red field with a white hammer and sickle. First version having both sides be equal size, second version having the Soviet half as a canton, third version similar to the first but with the Soviet half shortened and the hammer and sickles position adjusted.
	Late 1940s	State flag of the Armenian SSR	A red field with a white depiction of Mount Ararat, with a golden hammer, sickle and star, fimbriated in red, with a gold overlapping pattern on the lower half.
	Late 1940s	State flag of the Armenian SSR	Similar to the previous flag, but with the Mount Ararat depiction extended, with the Armenian abbreviation of the Republic in red at the bottom, the pattern moved to the hoist, and the star moved to the canton.
	Late 1940s	State flag of the Armenian SSR	A blue field with a white depiction of Mount Ararat, with a golden hammer and sickle in between the peaks, and a gold star over the left peak, with a red wavy topped field with the Armenian abbreviation of the Republic in gold within it.
	Late 1940s	State flag of the Armenian SSR	Similar to the previous flag, but with the blue replaced with yellow, the hammer, sickle and star moved to near the hoist, with the hammer and sickle fimbriated in gold and the star recoloured to red within a gold circle, and the republic's abbreviation removed.
	Late 1940s	State flag of the Armenian SSR	A red field within rounded orange hoist side and blue fly side, possibly intended to mimic the Armenian tricolour, with a blue hammer and sickle, fimbriated in gold, on the upper left orange side, and an orange star, fimbriated in gold, on the upper right blue side; includes also five white storks, two on each side flying towards a larger stork in the middle.

=== Turkmen SSR ===
Flag	Date	Proposed Use	Description
	1925	State flag of the Turkmen SSR	A red field with a gold hammer, sickle and star on the canton, and four carpet gels on the fly. Drafted during the creation of the republican constitution, ultimately rejected.

== Other ==
This section includes unofficial, misattributed, and alleged flags, alongside other designs.

=== Organizations ===
Flag	Date	Use	Description
	1961–1991	Flag of the Aeroflot	A red field with a light blue triangle with the Aeroflot emblem, a winged hammer and sickle, in white, and a gold star in the canton.
	circa 1960s–1991	Flag of the Young Pioneers	A red field with the emblem of the Young Pioneers in the center.

=== Unofficial ===
Flag	Date	Use	Description
	1923	Unofficial flag of the Soviet Union	A red field with a white shield consisting of a red hammer and sickle, with an abbreviation of the nation above it near the hoist. Only known usage at the opening of the Nizhniy Novgorod fair on July 1st 1923.
	circa 1930s–1991	Portrait flags	Red flags consisting of portraits of mostly important figures throughout Soviet history within white circles. Most commonly used examples include Karl Marx, Friedrich Engels, Vladimir Lenin, and, between the 1930s and 1950s, Joseph Stalin. Mostly used in demonstrations and parades.
	circa 1930s–1991	Unofficial flag of the Soviet Army	A red field with a gold hammer and sickle within a golden fimbriated red star. Although such a design existed, it was never officially adopted by the Soviet Army.

=== Alleged ===
Flag	Date	Use	Description
		Flag of the Soviet Union	A red field with a gold hammer, sickle, and star within a golden wreath. Once used in a painting of Lenin from 1929, became popular on the internet around the 2000s, sometimes mistaken as an actual flag used by the Soviet Union.
		Flag of the Soviet Airborne Forces	A blue field with a green stripe on the lower edge, with the symbol of the VDV, a paratrooper with two airplanes on both sides of the parachute, with a golden fimbriated red star. Most likely a post-Soviet design that began circulation in 1992.
	circa 1939	Flag of the Buryat-Mongol ASSR	A red field with an abbreviation of the Russian SFSR in Russian, and below it an alleged Buryat-Mongol abbreviation, with below it inscriptions of the republic in Russian and Buryat in gold on the canton. Considered an erroneous design, due to contemporary abbreviations using only "RSFSR", "SSSR", and "ASSR", and not the abbreviation as shown on the flag, which is from modern Mongolian.
	1953–1956	Reverse of the state flag of the Karelo-Finnish SSR	A red field with light blue and green stripes on the lower edge. Likely made to fit with the other republics, though a fictitious one, due to the KFSSR being dissolved in 1956, before the official 1981 republican flag regulations.
	1955–1980	Flag of the Soviet Union	A dark red field with a gold hammer, sickle and star on the canton. The darker shade of red was alleged to have been used before the 1980 regulations, though no such shade change ever occurred.

== See also ==
- Flag of the Soviet Union
- Flags of the Soviet Republics
- List of Soviet navy flags
- Coat of arms of the Soviet Union
- Hammer and sickle
- Red star
- Republics of the Soviet Union
