= Foucher =

Foucher is a surname, and may refer to:

- Alfred A. Foucher (1865–1952), French scholar
- André Foucher (cyclist) (1933–2025), French road bicycle racer
- Armand Foucher (1898–1976), businessman and local politician in Quebec
- Louis-Charles Foucher (1760–1829), notary and politician in Quebec
- Simon Foucher (1644–1696), French philosopher

== See also ==
- Fouché (disambiguation)
