= Gaston Hardy =

Canadian politician

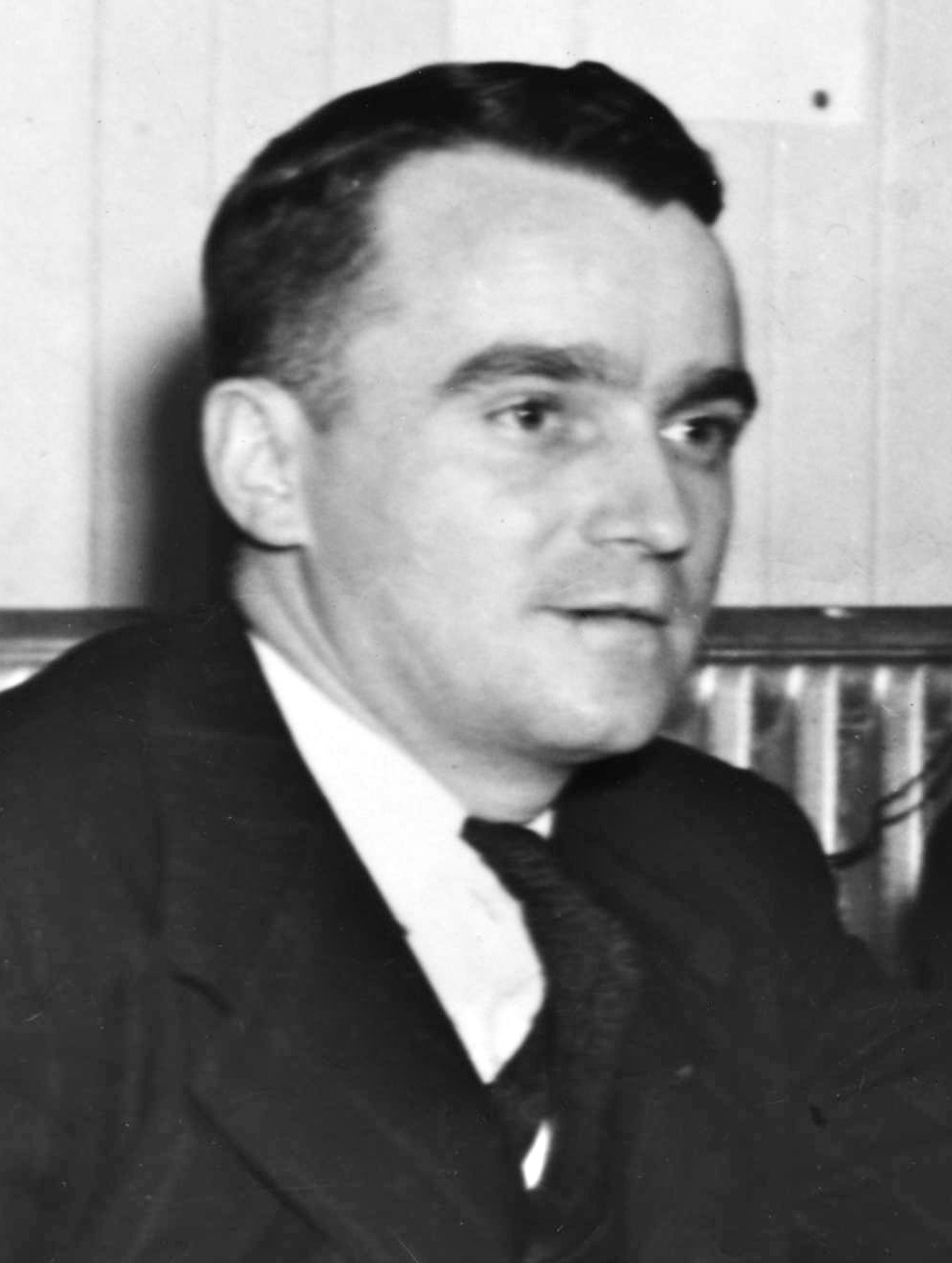
Gaston Hardy in 1945

Gaston Hardy (April 22, 1917 – July 15, 1977) was a municipal and provincial politician in Shawinigan Falls, Quebec. He was the 13th Mayor of the City of Shawinigan Falls, from 1954 to 1957.

== Biography ==
Gaston Hardy was born in 1917 in Portneuf, Quebec. He completed commercial scientific studies in 1934 in Trois-Rivières. In 1942, he settled in Shawinigan Falls, where he worked for the Aluminium Company of Canada (Alcan). He later worked as insurance agent. He once lived at 1512, rue Saint-Joseph, in the Saint-Marc neighborhood.

In the July 5, 1954 general municipal election, Hardy ran for mayor of Shawinigan Falls and won the election over the other candidate, Paul-Émile Bélanger, a businessman. He was sworn into office on July 12, 1954. During Hardy's term, the City created a city planning department and appointed a full-time city planner. On January 7, 1957 mayor Hardy's proposal to annex to the City the three neighbouring municipalities of Shawinigan-Sud, Shawinigan-Est and Baie-Shawinigan was defeated by a majority of the City council members. On January 14, 1957 Hardy announced his resignation as mayor for reasons of health problems, on the advice of his doctors. A by-election was called for February 11, 1957 to elect a new mayor for the remaining 10 months of the term. The two candidates were businessman J.-Armand Foucher and alderman Fernand Bilodeau. Foucher won.

Hardy was the Union Nationale candidate in the district of Saint-Maurice in the 1956 and the 1960 Quebec general elections. Each time he lost against incumbent MLA René Hamel.

He died in 1977 in Shawinigan.

Rue Hardy in the Shawinigan-Nord neighbourhood was named to honour him.

== Notes and references ==
Political offices
Preceded by François Roy	Mayor of Shawinigan Falls; 1954–1957	Succeeded by J.-Armand Foucher
