= Fouché =

Fouché or Fouche may refer to:

- George Fouché, South African race car driver
- Guy Fouché (1921–1998), French operatic tenor
- Jacobus Johannes Fouché, former president of South Africa
- James Fouché (born 1998), New Zealand racing cyclist
- Joseph Fouché, French statesman and Napoleon's chief of police
- Margareta Fouché, German noble
- Nicolas Fouché, French artist
