= List of Soviet navy flags =

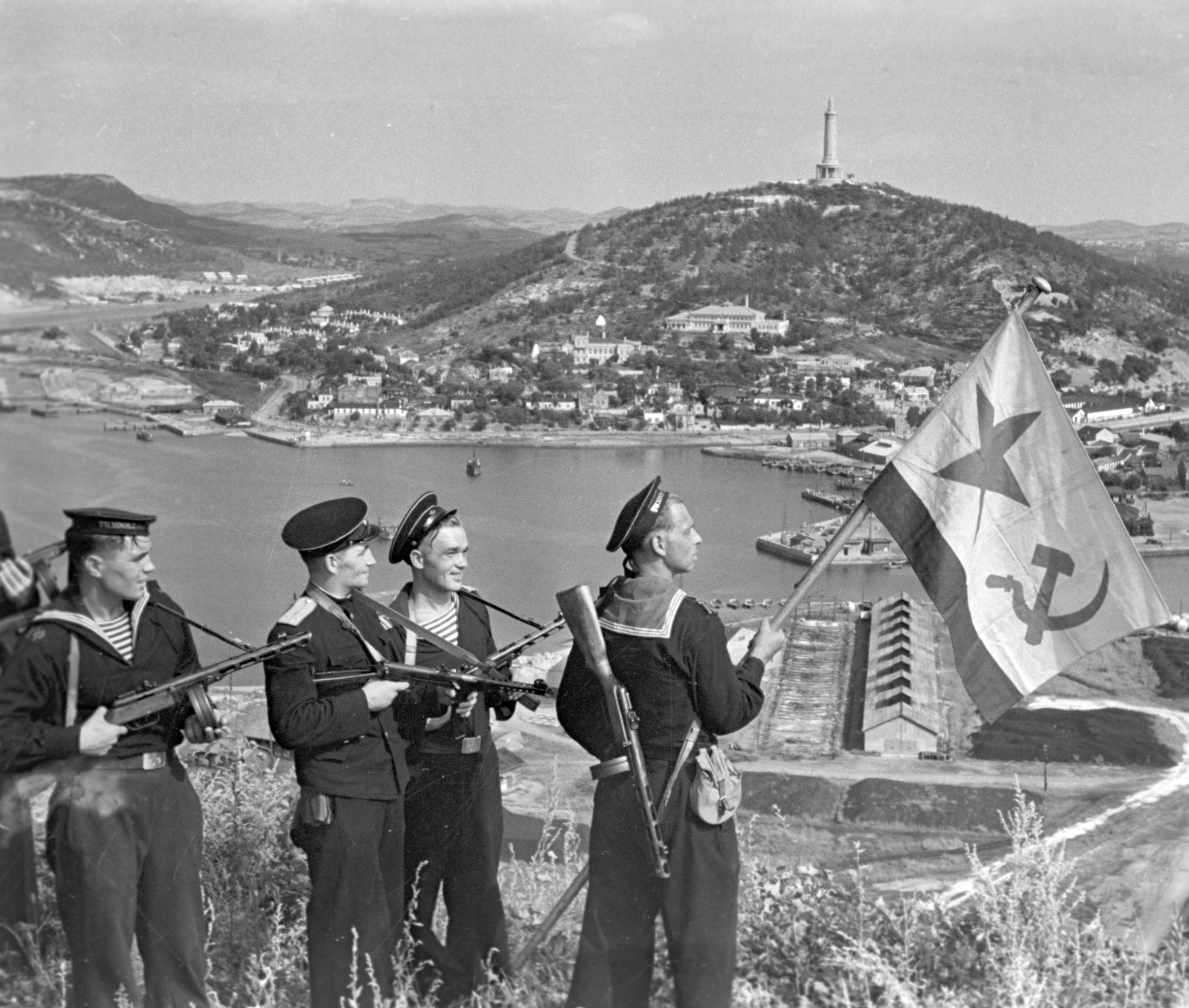
Marines of the Pacific Fleet raise the Soviet naval ensign in Port Arthur, 1945.

This is a list of naval flags of the Soviet Union.

== Jack ==
Flag	Date	Name	Note
	29 August 1924 — 7 July 1932	Jack and fortress flag of naval fortresses	
	7 July 1932 — 16 November 1950 or 21 April 1964?	Jack and fortress flag of naval fortresses	
	16 November 1950 or 21 April 1964? — 21 July 1992	Jack or fortress flag	

== Ensign and flag ==
Flag	Date	Name	Note
	1920–1923	Naval Ensign of the Russian Soviet Socialist Republic	
	29 August 1924 — 27 May 1935	Naval ensign of the Soviet Union	
	27 May 1935 — 16 November 1950	Naval ensign of the Soviet Union	
	16 November 1950 — 21 July 1992	Naval ensign of the Soviet Union	
	23 November 1926 — 27 May 1935	Honorary revolutionary naval flag	
	27 May 1935 — 16 November 1950	Honorary revolutionary naval flag flown by the workers' and Peasants' Red Army's ships and task forces	
	16 November 1950 — 21 July 1992	Red Banner naval ensign	
	20 June 1942 — 16 November 1950	Guards naval ensign	
	16 November 1950 — 21 July 1992	Guards naval ensign	
	20 June 1942 — 16 November 1950	Guards Red Banner naval ensign	
	16 November 1950 — 21 July 1992	Guards Red Banner naval ensign	

=== Ensigns of auxiliary vessels of the Navy ===
Flag	Date	Name	Note
	29 August 1924 — 27 May 1935	Ensign flown by auxiliary and port craft of the Workers' and Peasants' Red Navy in case their captains were naval officers	
	29 August 1924 — 27 May 1935	Ensign flown by auxiliary and port craft of the Workers' and Peasants' Red Navy in case their captains were not naval officers	
	4 December 1925 — 18 July 1940	Flag of predraft naval training offices	
	27 May 1935 — 16 November 1950	Ensign of auxiliary and harbour vessels of the Workers' and Peasants' Red Army's naval forces	
	16 November 1950 — 21 April 1964	Flag of auxiliary vessels of the fleet (flotilla) support command	
	21 April 1964 — 21 July 1992	Ensign of auxiliary vessels of the Soviet Navy	
	29 August 1924 — 27 May 1935	Ensign flown by waterborne vehicles of naval fortresses commanded by military officers	
	29 August 1924 — 27 May 1935	Ensign flown by waterborne vehicles of naval fortresses commanded by civilians	
	29 August 1924 — 27 May 1935	Ensign of hydrographic and pilot vessels and lightships commanded by naval officers	Together — Flag of chief of the Hydrographic Department of the People's Commissariat for the Navy.
	29 August 1924 — 27 May 1935	Ensign of hydrographic and pilot vessels and lightships commanded not by naval officers	
	3 April 1929 — 27 May 1935	Ensign of vessels of EPRON	
	3 September 1943 — 16 November 1950	Ensign of the navy's rescue vessels	
	16 November 1950 — 1979	Ensign of the navy's rescue vessels	
	1979 — 21 July 1992	Ensign of the navy's rescue service	
	27 May 1935 — 16 November 1950	Ensign of hydrographic and pilot vessels and lighthouses	
	16 November 1950 — 21 April 1964	Ensign of hydrographic vessels and lightships	
	21 April 1964 — 21 July 1992	Ensign of hydrographic vessels of the Soviet Navy	

=== Flags of ships of Border Guard Force ===
Flag	Date	Name	Note
	29 August 1924 — 27 May 1935	Ensign of vessels operated by OGPU's border guard flotillas	Together — Flag of Chairman OGPU and his deputy.
	27 May 1935 — 16 November 1950	Ensign of border guard ships of the People's Commissariat of Internal Affairs (NKVD) of the USSR	
	16 November 1950 — 21 April 1964	Naval flag of ships and boats of the Border Guard Force of the State Security Ministry of the USSR	
	21 April 1964 — 21 July 1992	Naval flag flown by ships and vessels of the Border Guard Force	
	16 November 1950 — 21 April 1964	Red Banner naval flag flown by ships and boats of the Border Guard Force of the State Security Ministry of the USSR	
	21 April 1964 — 21 July 1992	Red Banner naval flag flown by ships and boats of the Border Guard Force of KGB under the aegis of the Council of Ministers of the USSR	
	16 November 1950 — 21 April 1964	Guards naval flag flown by ships and boats of the Border Guard Force of the State Security Ministry of the USSR	Cancelled because of absence in boundary armies of the Guards ships.
	16 November 1950 — 21 April 1964	Guards Red Banner naval flag flown by ships and boats of the Border Guard Force of the State Security Ministry of the USSR	Cancelled because of absence in boundary armies of the Guards ships.

=== Naval flag of the Interior Force ===
Flag	Date	Name	Note
	18 March 1983 — 21 July 1992	Naval flag of ships (boats) and vessels operated by the Interior Force of the USSR's Ministry of Interior	

== Flags of officials ==
=== Flags of commanders-in-chief Armed Forces ===
Flag	Date	Name	Note
	29 August 1924 — 27 May 1935	Flag of the chairman and deputy chairman of USSR's Revolutionary Military Council	
	29 August 1924 — 1 March 1927	Flag of the Red Army and Red Navy inspector and the commander-in-chief of all armed services of the Soviet Union in time of war	
	1 March 1927 — 7 July 1932	Flag of members of the Revolutionary Military Council of the USSR	
	7 July 1932 — 27 May 1935	Flag of inspector of the naval forces of the Workers' and Peasants' Red Army	
	27 May 1935 — 7 December 1938	Flag of inspector of the naval forces of Workers' and Peasants' Red Army	
	27 May 1935 — 16 November 1950	Flag of peoples's commissar of defence of the USSR and his deputies	
	21 April 1964 — 21 July 1992	Flag of defence minister of the USSR	
	21 April 1964 — 21 July 1992	Flag of supreme commander-in-chief of the Armed Forces of the USSR	
	27 May 1935 — 16 November 1950	Flag of chief of staff of the Workers' and Peasants' Red Army	
	21 April 1964 — 21 July 1992	Flag of chief of the General Staff of the Armed Forces of the USSR	

=== Flags of commanders-in-chief of the Navy ===
Flag	Date	Name	Note
	29 August 1924 — 27 May 1935	Flag of the commander of the Soviet Union's naval forces	
	27 May 1935 — 7 December 1938	Flag of inspector of the naval forces of Workers' and Peasants' Red Army	
	7 December 1938 — 16 November 1950	Flag of people's commissar of the Soviet Navy	
	7 December 1938 — 16 November 1950	Flag of deputy people's commissar of the Soviet Navy	
	16 November 1950 — 21 April 1964	Flag of the naval minister	
	21 April 1964 — 21 July 1992	Flag of commander-in-chief of the Soviet Navy	
	29 August 1924 — 1 March 1927	Flag of the chief of staff of the Workers' and Peasants' Red Navy	
	1 March 1927 — 7 July 1932	Flag of chief of the Training and Combat Directorate of the Naval Forces of the Workers' and Peasants' Red Army	
	7 December 1938 — 16 November 1950	Flag of chief of the Main Naval Staff of the Workers' and Peasants' Red Army's Navy	
	16 November 1950 — 21 April 1964	Flag of chief of the Naval General Staff	
	21 April 1964 — 21 July 1992	Flag of chief of the Main Staff of the Soviet Navy	

=== Flags of officials of the Navy ===
Flag	Date	Name	Note
	29 August 1924 — 27 May 1935	Flag of commander of the naval forces on a specific sea	
	27 May 1935 — 16 November 1950	Flag of fleet commander	
	16 November 1950 — 21 July 1992	Flag of fleet commander	
	29 August 1924 — 27 May 1935	Flag of the senior admiral commanding a warship task force	
	27 May 1935 — 16 November 1950	Flag of the senior admiral commanding a warship task force	
	16 November 1950 — 21 April 1964	Flag of the senior admiral commanding a warship task force	
	21 April 1964 — 21 July 1992	Flag of flotilla or squadron commander	
	29 August 1924 — 27 May 1935	Flag of a junior admiral commanding a warship task force	
	27 May 1935 — 16 November 1950	Flag of a junior admiral commanding a warship task force	
	16 November 1950 — 21 April 1964	Flag of a junior admiral commanding a warship task force	
	21 April 1964 — 21 July 1992	Flag of task force commander	

=== Flags of officials of auxiliary services of the Navy ===
Flag	Date	Name	Note
	29 August 1924 — 1 March 1927	Flag of the chief of the Soviet naval forces for logistics	Together — Ensign of hydrographic and pilot vessels and lightships commanded by naval officers.
	29 August 1924 — 1 March 1927	Flag of chief of the Hydrographic Department of the People's Commissariat for the Navy	Together — Ensign of hydrographic and pilot vessels and lightships commanded by naval officers.
	29 August 1924 — 1 March 1927	Flag of chief of the naval training establishments of the Workers' and Peasants' Red Navy	
	29 August 1924 — 1 March 1927	Flag of the chief of staff of the Workers' and Peasants' Red Navy	
	1 March 1927 — 7 July 1932	Flag of chief of the Training and Combat Directorate of the Naval Forces of the Workers' and Peasants' Red Army	
	5 March 1926 — 27 May 1935	Flag of commanders of naval sea ports	
	29 August 1924 — 27 May 1935	Flag of military port commanders	
	27 May 1935 — 16 November 1950	Flag of military port commanders	
	3 September 1943 — 16 November 1950	Flag of rescue service chiefs of fleets and flotillas	
	3 September 1943 — 16 November 1950	Flag of military pilots	

=== Flags of officials of the Border Guard Force ===
Flag	Date	Name	Note
	29 August 1924 — 27 May 1935	Flag of Chairman OGPU and his deputy	Together — Ensign of vessels operated by OGPU's border guard flotillas.
	27 May 1935 — 16 November 1950	Flag of the People's Commissar of internal affairs of the USSR	
	16 November 1950 — 21 April 1964	Flag of minister of state security of the USSR	
	21 April 1964 — 21 July 1992	Flag of chairman of KGB under the aegis of the Council of Ministers of the USSR	
	16 November 1950 — 21 April 1964	Flag of commander of the Border Guard Force of the State Security Ministry of the USSR	
	21 April 1964 — 21 July 1992	Flag of commander of the Border Guard Force of KGB of the USSR	
	29 August 1924 — 12 July 1930	Flag of chief of the Border Guards Department of OGPU	
	29 August 1924 — 12 July 1930	Flag of OGPU District commanders who had OGPU border guard flotillas	
	12 July 1930 — 27 May 1935	Flag of chief of the Main Border Guard Department of OGPU	
	12 July 1930 — 27 May 1935	Flag of chief and assistant chief of the Naval Inspectorate of the Main Border Guard Department and OGPU forces	
	12 July 1930 — 27 May 1935	Flag of OGPU district commanders and deputy commanders and GPU commanders and deputy commanders in the USSR's republics	
	12 July 1930 — 27 May 1935	Flag of chief and assistant chiefs of OGPU districts' Border Guard departments	
	16 November 1950 — 21 April 1964	Flag of district commanders of the Border Guard Force of the State Security Ministry of the USSR	
	21 April 1964 — 21 July 1992	Flag of border guard district commanders	
	12 July 1930 — 27 May 1935	Flag of commanders of OGPU's district vessel bases	
	16 November 1950 — 21 April 1964	Flag of commander of border guard ship (boat) detachments	
	21 April 1964 — 21 July 1992	Flag of commanders of the border guard task forces	

== Broad pennants ==
Broad pennant	Date	Name	Proportions
	29 August 1924 — 27 August 1935	Broad pennant of commander of ship detachments Broad pennant of commander of ship divisions	2:11
	27 May 1935 — 16 November 1950	Broad pennant of division commander of the naval forces of the Workers' and Peasants' Red Army	1:5
	16 November 1950 — 21 April 1964	Broad pennant of ship division commanders	1:5
	21 April 1964 — 21 July 1992	Broad pennant of task forces commanders	1:5
	27 May 1935 — 16 November 1950	Broad pennant of commander of boat detachment of the naval forces of the Workers' and Peasants' Red Army	1:5
	16 November 1950 — 21 April 1964	Broad pennant of 4-th rank ship detachment commanders	1:5
	21 April 1964 — 21 July 1992	Broad pennant of ship division commanders	1:5
	29 August 1924 — 27 May 1935	Broad pennant of the senior naval chief at the roadstead	2:11
	27 May 1935 — 16 November 1950	Broad pennant of the senior naval chief at the roadstead	1:5
	16 November 1950 — 21 July 1992	Broad pennant of senior commander at the roadstead	1:5
	29 August 1924 — 12 July 1930	Broad pennant of chiefs of regional OGPU departments and chiefs of the Border Guard units, having under their command OGPU's border guard ships	2:11
	12 July 1930 — 27 May 1935	Broad pennant of commanders of naval detachment bases of OGPU	2:11
	29 August 1924 — 12 July 1930	Broad pennant of chiefs of border guard units of OGPU's regional departments, who were in charge of OGPU border guard flotillas' ships	2:11
	29 August 1924 — 12 July 1930	Broad pennant of chiefs of OGPU's border guard flotillas	2:11
	12 July 1930 — 27 May 1935	Broad pennant of commanders of OGPU's vessel detachments	2:11
	16 November 1950 — 21 April 1964	Broad pennant of commanders of patrol boat divisions of the Border Guard Force	1:5
	21 April 1964 — 21 July 1992	Broad pennant of commanders of border guard task forces	1:5
	29 August 1924 — 27 May 1935	Broad pennant of chief of the Navigation Safety Department	2:11
	3 April 1929 — ?	Broad pennant of EPRON's rescue diver detachment	2:11
	3 April 1929 — ?	Broad pennant of EPRON's chief	2:11
	27 May 1935 — 16 November 1950	Broad pennant of chiefs of hydrographic detachments	1:5
	3 September 1943 — 16 November 1950	Broad pennant of commanders of emergency rescue detachments and riverine emergency rescue detachments	1:5

== See also ==
- List of Russian navy flags
- List of Russian flags
- List of flags of the Soviet Union
