= Flag of the Soviet Union =

State Flag of the Union of Soviet Socialist Republics Государственный флаг Союза Советских Социалистических Республик
- Красное Знамя (lit. 'Red Banner')
- Use: State flag, civil and state ensign
- Proportion: 1∶2
- Adopted: 30 December 1922 (original); 19 August 1955 (last version)
- Relinquished: 26 December 1991
- Design: Plain red banner, with the canton consisting of a gold hammer and sickle topped off by a red five-point star bordered in gold.
- Reverse flag
- Use: State flag, civil and state ensign
- Adopted: 1980
- Relinquished: 26 December 1991
- Vertical flag
- Use: State flag, civil and state ensign
- Adopted: 1980
- Relinquished: 26 December 1991

The State Flag of the Union of Soviet Socialist Republics, also simply known as the Soviet flag or the Red Banner, is a red flag with two communist symbols displayed in the canton: a gold hammer and sickle topped off by a red five-point star bordered in gold. The flag's design and symbolism are derived from several sources, but emerged during the Russian Revolution. It has also come to serve for some as a symbol representing communism as a whole, recognized as such in international circles, even after the dissolution of the Soviet Union in 1991.

The plain red flag, which was a traditional revolutionary symbol long before 1917, was incorporated into the Soviet flag to pay tribute to the international aspect of the workers' revolution. On the other hand, the unique hammer-and-sickle design was a modern industrial touch adopted from the Russian Revolution; it represented the "victorious and enduring revolutionary alliance" by unifying the hammer (i.e. workers) and the sickle (i.e. peasants).

The first flag was adopted in December 1922. In 1923, 1924, 1936, and in 1955, statutes were adopted that resulted in adjustments to the hammer's handle length and the sickle's shape. In 1980, an amendment was made to the 1955 decree that removed the hammer and sickle displayed on the flag's reverse side, though the legal description remained completely unchanged. The design of the 1955 Soviet flag served as the basis for all of the flags of the Union Republics.

== Symbolism and design ==
The flag of the Soviet Union consisted of a plain red flag with a gold hammer crossed with a gold sickle placed beneath a gold-bordered red star. This symbol is in the upper left canton of the red flag.

The colour red honours the red flag of the Paris Commune of 1871; the red star and the hammer and sickle are symbols of communism and socialism.

The hammer symbolises urban industrial workers while the sickle symbolises agricultural workers (peasants), who form the state together with the proletarian class.

The flag's design was legislated in 1955, which gave a clear way to define and create the flag. This resulted in a change of the hammer's handle length and the shape of the sickle. The adopted statute stated that:

1. The ratio of width to length of the flag is 1:2.
2. The hammer and sickle are in a square with sides equal to 1/4 of the flag's height. The sharp tip of the sickle lies in the center of the upper side of the square, and the handles of the hammer and sickle rest in the bottom corners of the square. The length of the hammer and its handle is 3/4 of the square diagonal.
3. The five-pointed star is inscribed into a circle with a diameter of 1/8 of the flag's height, the circle being tangent to the upper side of the square.
4. The distance of the vertical axis of the star, hammer and sickle from the hoist is 1/3 of the flag's height. The distance from the upper side of the flag to the center of the star is 1/8 of the flag's height.

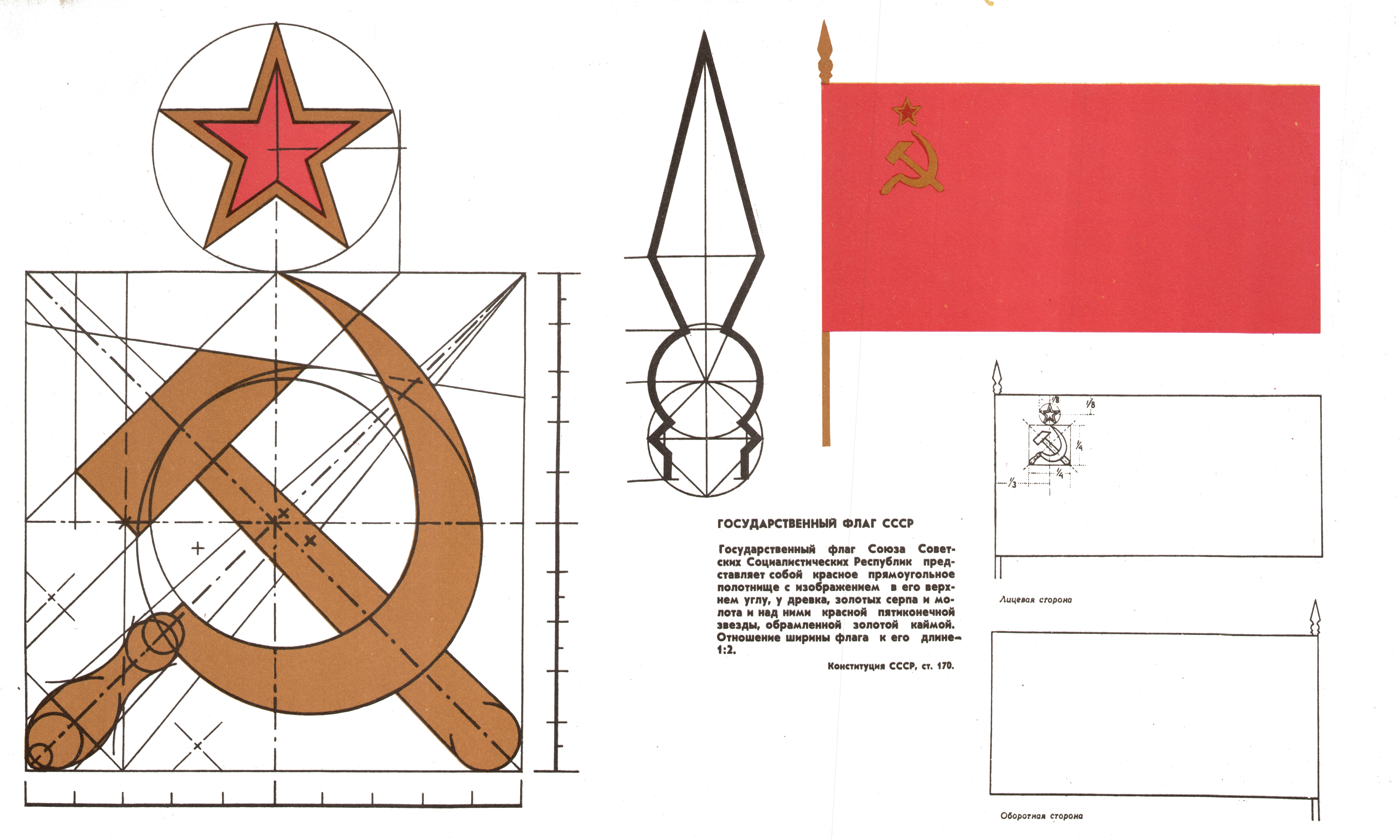
Official Construction Sheet for the State Flag of the USSR (1955–1991).

The reverse side of the Soviet flag as it appeared from 1980 to 1991.

The vertical display of the Soviet flag as it appeared from 1980 to 1991.

Officially since 1980, the reverse side of the flag was a plain red field without the hammer and sickle. In practice, however, this was very commonly disregarded by flag makers as it was far easier and less costly to simply print the flag through and through, with the obverse design mirrored on the reverse. It was also common to see the reverse of the flag bear the hammer and sickle in the obverse formation. An example of the flag demonstrating its de jure status as being only one-sided is that of the Soviet flag atop the Moscow Kremlin which bore the single-side official design.

For vertical display, the flag was made with the distinct difference of having the hammer and sickle rotated 90 degrees in order to compensate for the change in dimensions. Although common in official practice, a typical flag owner would simply turn a standard design flag 90 degrees to the right and hang it by the hoist (not flipped like in the US flag).

== History ==
During the establishment of the Russian Soviet Federative Socialist Republic, Vladimir Lenin and his followers had considered the inclusion of a sword symbol in addition to the hammer and sickle as part of the state seal on which the flag was eventually based. The idea was dismissed as too visually aggressive, with Lenin apparently affirming, "A sword is not one of our symbols."

The first official flag was adopted in December 1922 at the First Congress of Soviets of the USSR. It was agreed that the red banner "was transformed from the symbol of the Party to the symbol of a state, and around that flag gathered the peoples of the soviet republics to unite into one state — the Union of Soviet Socialist Republics". On 30 December 1922, the Congress adopted a Declaration and Agreement on the establishment of the USSR. Article 22 of the Agreement states: "The USSR has a flag, coat of arms and a state seal." The description of the first flag was given in the 1924 Soviet Constitution, accepted in the second session of the executive committee (CIK) of the USSR on 6 July 1923. The text of Article 71 states: "The state flag of the Union of Soviet Socialist Republics consists of a red or scarlet field with the state's coat of arms." It was ordered with the unusual ratio of 4:1 in proportion and consisted of a red flag with the state coat of arms in the center. However, such a flag was never mass-produced. This flag was the official flag for four months, and was replaced as the official flag by the more familiar hammer and sickle design during the third session of the CIK of the USSR on 12 November 1923.

In the third session of the CIK of the USSR, the description of Soviet flag in the Constitution was changed, and article 71 was edited to read: "The state flag of the Union of Soviet Socialist Republics consists of a red or scarlet field, and in the canton a golden sickle and hammer, and a red five-pointed star bordered in gold above them. The ratio of width to length is 1:2." On 19 August 1955, the Statute on the State Flag of the Union of Soviet Socialist Republics was adopted by a decision of the Presidium of the Supreme Soviet of the USSR. This resulted in a change of the hammer's handle length and the shape of the sickle. On 15 August 1980, a new edition of the Statute on the State Flag of the Union of Soviet Socialist Republics was adopted, which did not make any changes to the flag's description aside from removing the hammer and sickle on the reverse side of the flag. From this point on, the flag stayed in use with this design until the disintegration of the USSR on 26 December 1991, at which time it ceased to be a national flag and replaced by national flags of the post-Soviet republics.

On 15 April 1996, Boris Yeltsin signed a presidential decree giving the Soviet flag (called the Victory Banner, after the banner that was raised above the Reichstag on 1 May 1945) status similar to that of the national flag. The hammer and sickle were removed from the flag, leaving only the star, but they were reinstated later. On certain holidays, the Victory Banner is flown along with the Russian flag.

=== Contemporary usage ===
In current times, the Soviet national flag (and similar flags) are widely used by those on the political far left, most often by those who support Marxism–Leninism, although the earlier (pre-Stalinist) flags are occasionally used by Trotskyists and those on the modern communist left.

The Soviet flag is also actively promoted in Russia as a symbol of nostalgia for the Soviet Union. Various politicians frequently utilize it as a symbol of the superpower status Russia lost in 1991.

Amidst the backdrop of the 2022 Russian invasion of Ukraine, the Communist Party of the Russian Federation proposed to the State Duma the adoption of the Soviet flag as the official flag of Russia on 19 April 2022. The use of Soviet symbols including its flag became very extensive by invading Russian forces over the course of the war along with the letter "Z".

On 17 June 2023, during the celebration for the 300th anniversary of Saint Petersburg, the respective flags of the Russian Empire (Black-yellow-white flag), Soviet Union, and Russian Federation were raised simultaneously at the Gulf of Finland.

Historical evolution of the flag of the Soviet Union

(30 December 1922 – 12 November 1923)

(12 November 1923 – 18 April 1924)

(18 April 1924 – 5 December 1936)

(5 December 1936 – 19 August 1955)

(19 August 1955 – 26 December 1991)

== Derived flags ==
The flags of the Soviet republics that constituted the USSR and the Victory Banner were all defaced (Note: In vexillology, defacement is the addition of a symbol or charge to a flag.) or modified versions of the Soviet flag.

Armenian SSR
(1952–1990)

Azerbaijan SSR
(1952–1991)

Byelorussian SSR
(1951–1991)

Estonian SSR
(1953–1990)

Georgian SSR
(1951–1990)

Karelo-Finnish SSR (Note: The Karelo-Finnish SSR was a short-lived Union Republic formed in 1940 from the Karelian ASSR with territory ceded from Finland in the Winter War. In 1956, it was demoted back to an ASSR within the RSFSR.)
(1953–1956)

Kazakh SSR
(1953–1991)
Kazakhstan
(1991–1992)

Kirghiz SSR
(1952–1991)
Kyrgyzstan
(1991–1992)

Latvian SSR
(1953–1990)

Lithuanian SSR
(1953–1988)

Moldavian SSR
(1952–1990)

Russian SFSR
(1954–1991)

Tajik SSR
(1953–1991)
Tajikistan
(1991–1992)

Turkmen SSR
(1953–1974)

Turkmen SSR
(1974–1991)
Turkmenistan
(1991–1992)

Ukrainian SSR
(1949–1991)

Uzbek SSR
(1952–1991)

=== Other derived flags ===
Transnistria (Note: The Pridnestrovian Moldavian Republic or Transnistria, is an unrecognized breakaway republic formed in 1991 after the breakup of the Soviet Union from territory internationally recognized as part of Moldova after the Transnistria War.)
(1990–present)

Vladimir Oblast
(1999–2017)

Vladimir Oblast
(2017–present)

Victory Banner of the Great Patriotic War (1945)

== Gallery ==
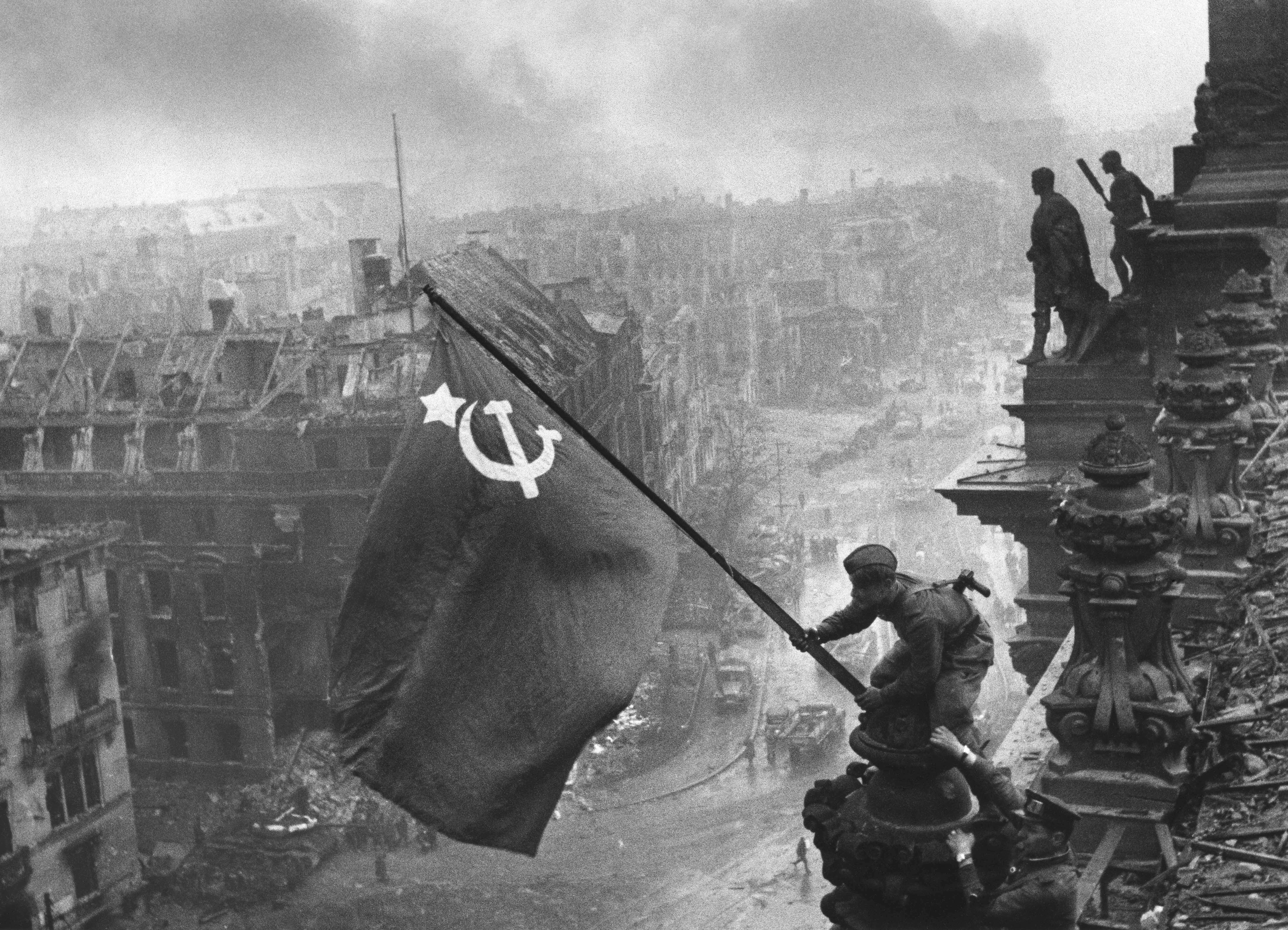
Raising a Flag over the Reichstag

Digital remake of the flag that was raised over the Reichstag

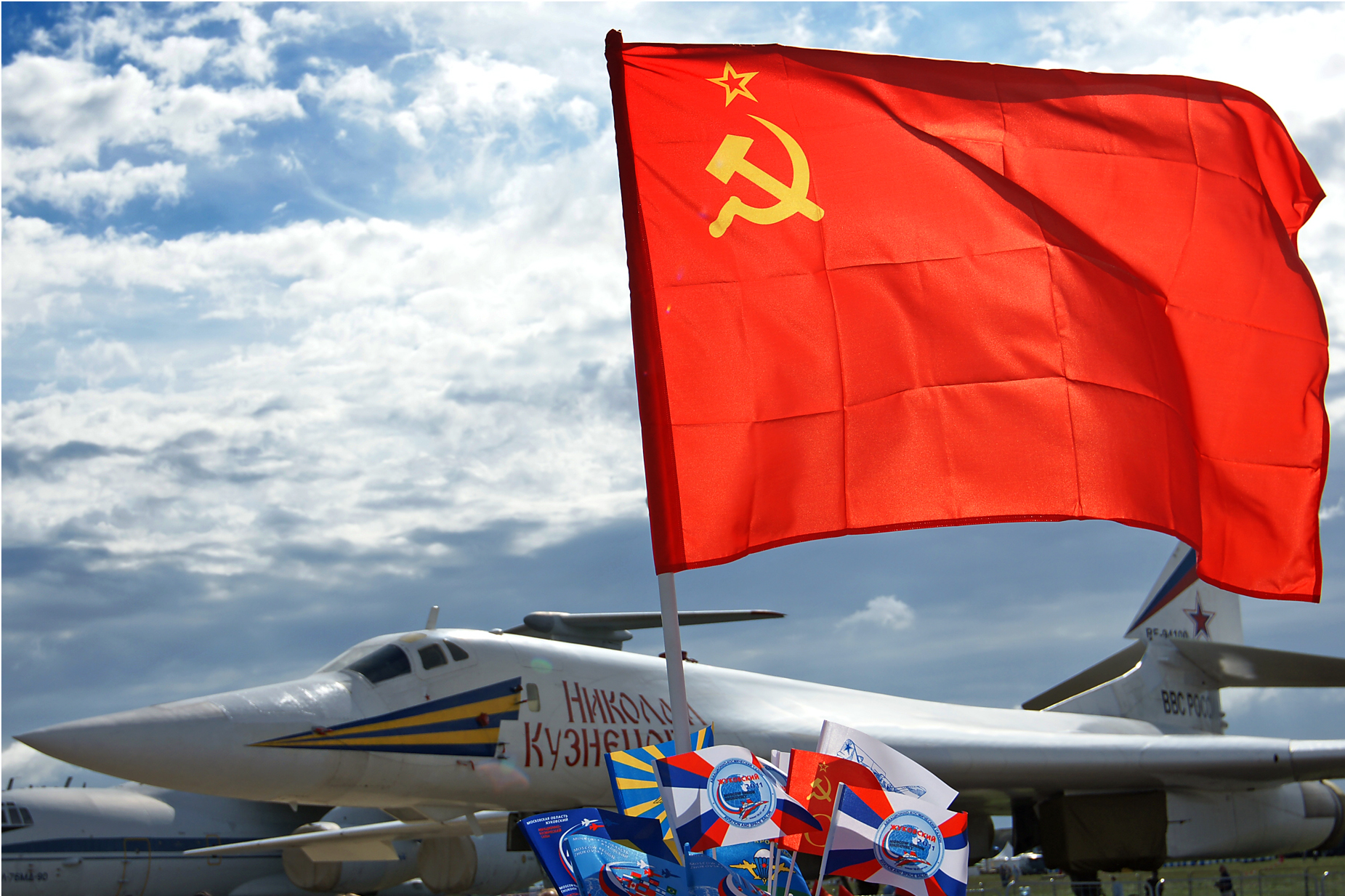
The Soviet flag along with an assortment of Russian and Soviet military flags

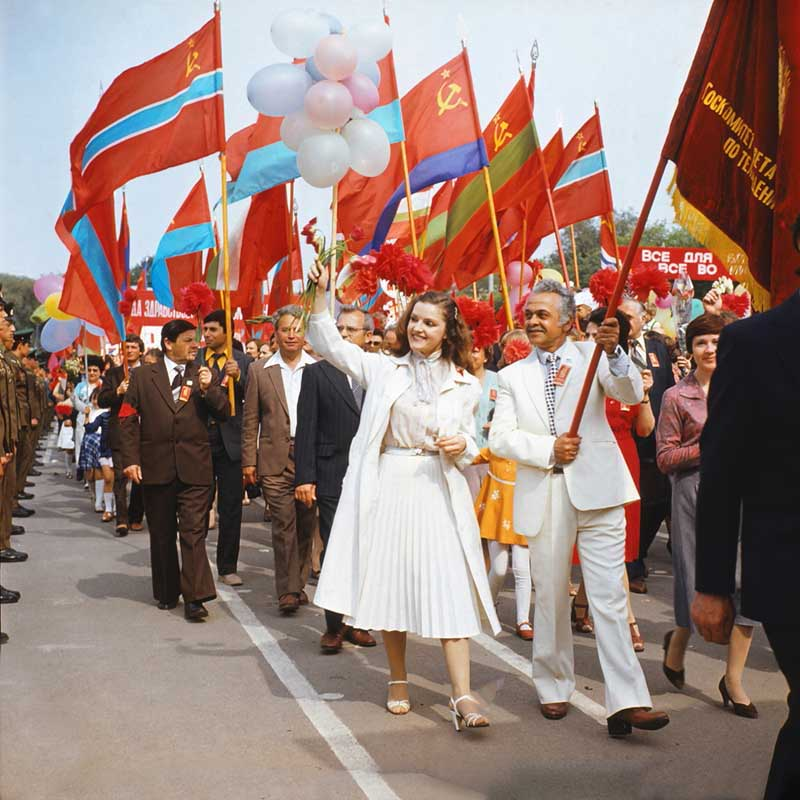
Flags of the Soviet Republics flown during a parade in Kishinev, the capital of the Moldavian SSR

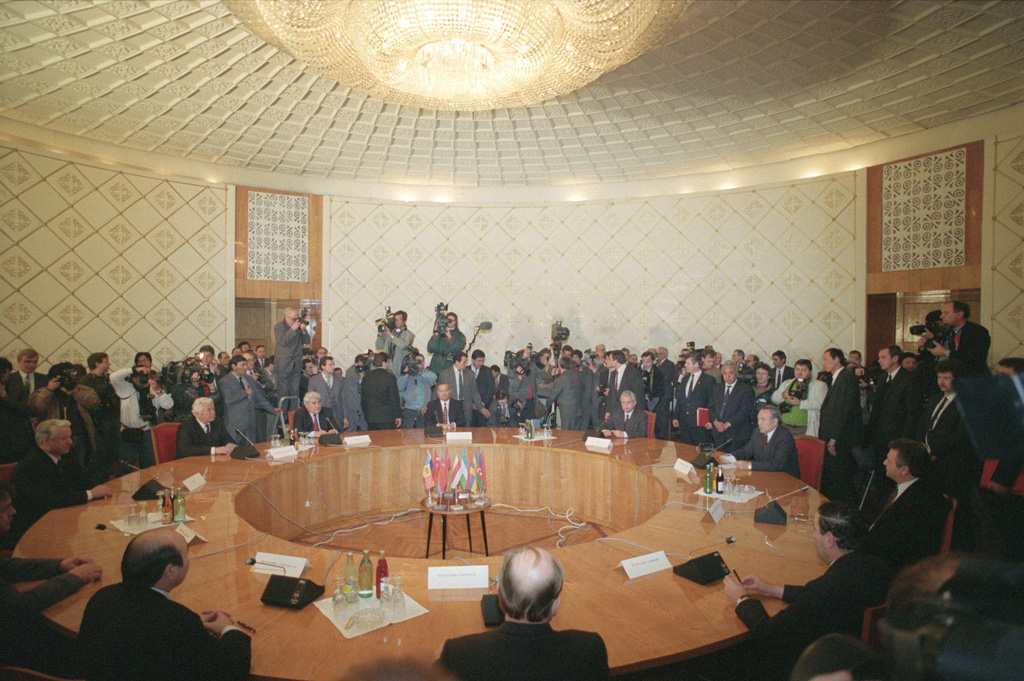
Remaining uses of Soviet republic flags visible during the signing of the Alma-Ata Protocol

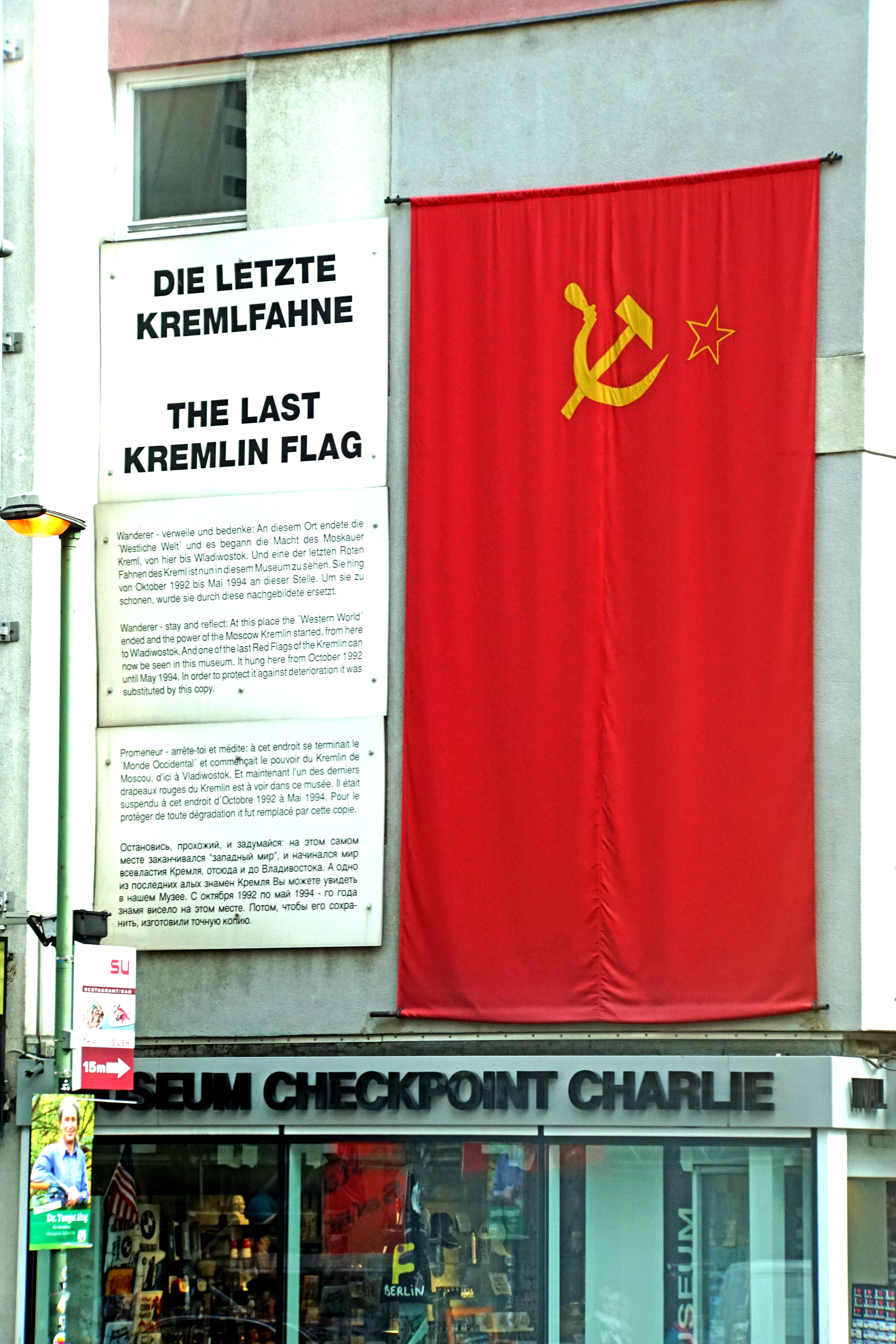
One of the last Soviet flags flown on the Kremlin, displayed at the Checkpoint Charlie Museum in Berlin

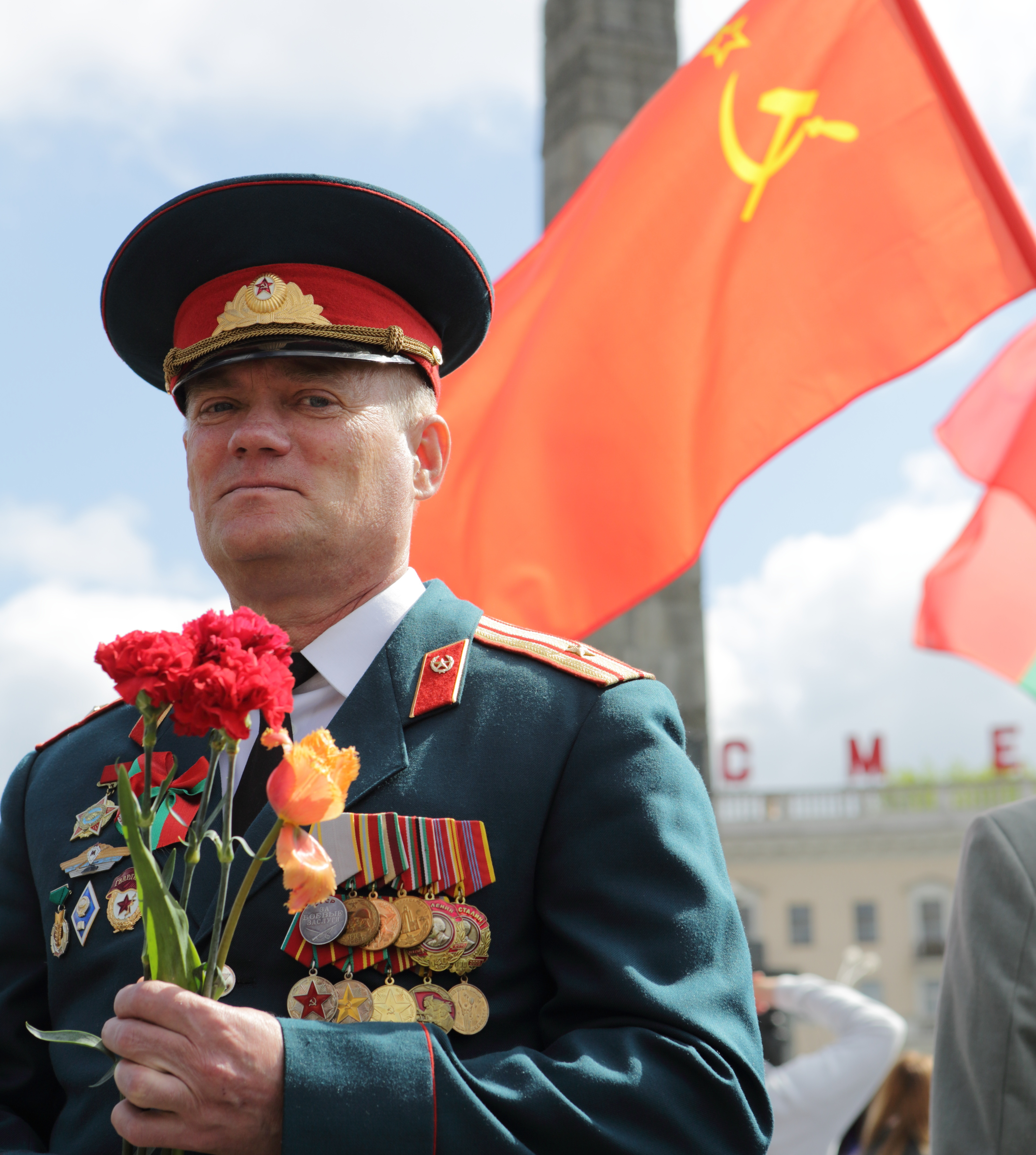
Member of the Armed Forces of Belarus pays tribute to the Victory Day in 2014, in front of a Soviet flag

The unofficial flag of the Soviet Union in 1923

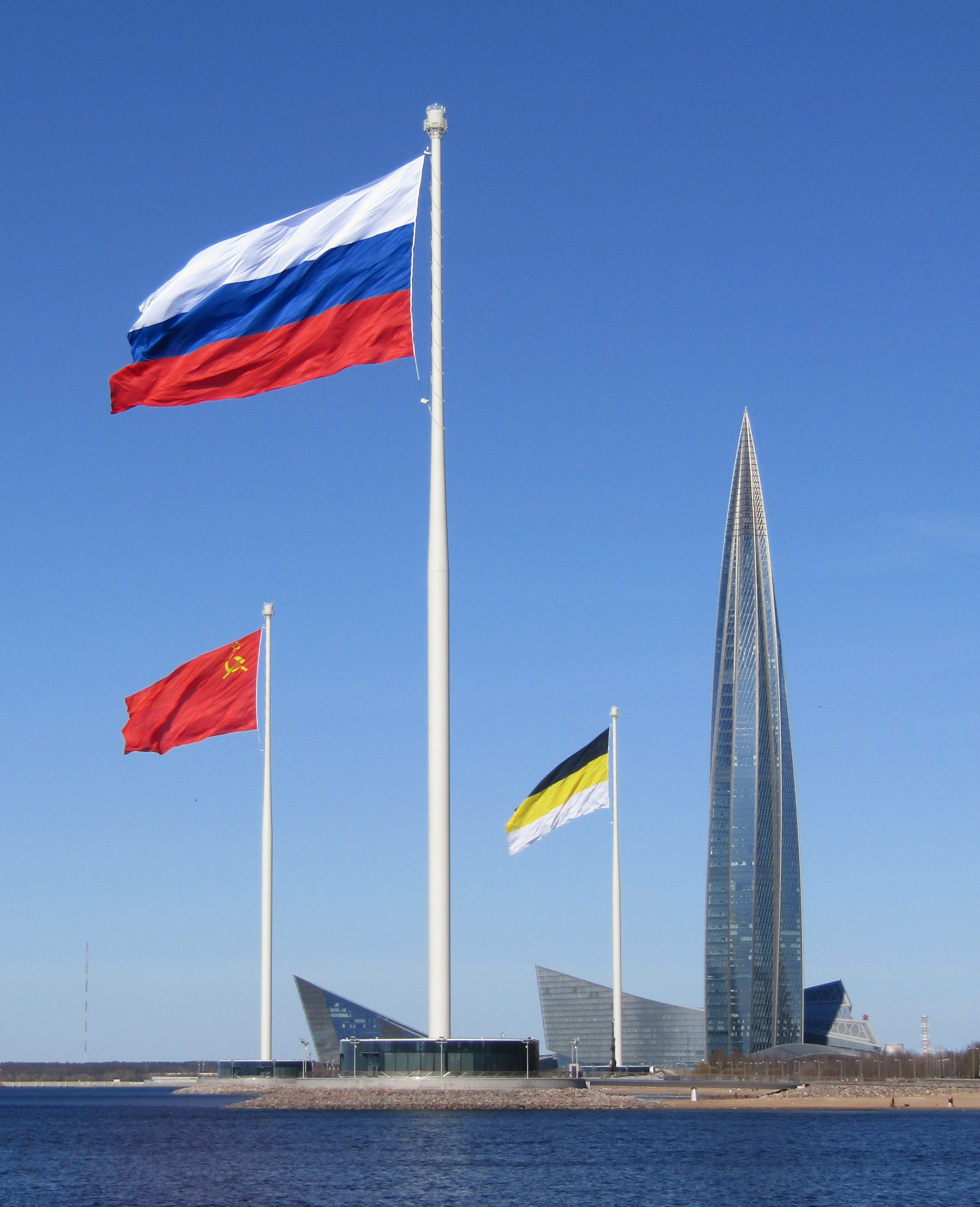
The flag of the Soviet Union on display in Saint Petersburg in 2023, alongside the black-yellow-white flag of the Russian Empire and the current-day flag of Russia

== See also ==
- Communist symbolism
- Flag of Russia
- Flags of the Soviet Republics
- List of flags of the Soviet Union
- Flags whose reverse differs from the obverse
- Hammer and sickle
- Red flag
- Red star
- State Emblem of the Soviet Union
