= Armand Foucher =

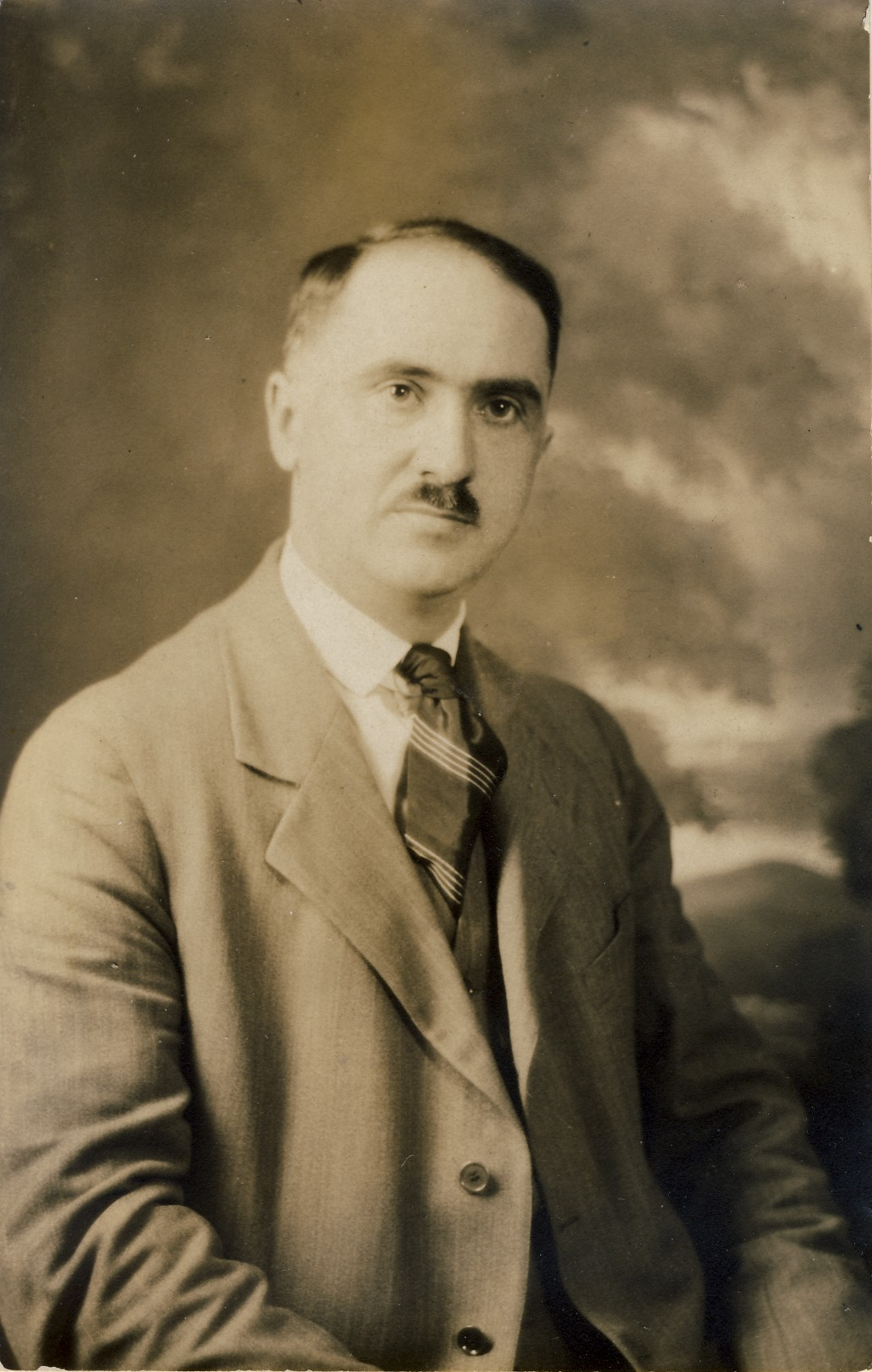
J.A. Foucher

J. Armand Foucher (1898–1976) was a businessman and local politician in Shawinigan, Quebec. He was the 14th Mayor of Shawinigan from 1957 to 1963.

== Biography ==
Joseph Armand Foucher was born November 20, 1898, in Saint-Paulin, Mauricie. He was the youngest son of Joseph Foucher and Herménégilde Leblanc.

In 1921, he married Estelle Frigon (daughter of Joseph-Auguste Frigon). The family lived in the village of Sainte-Flore, then moved in 1929 to the neighboring city of Shawinigan Falls.

In 1938, he began the publication of the small weekly newspaper Les Chutes in Shawinigan, which he published for 30 years, until 1968. He also published six other weekly newspapers in as many cities, including Le Laurentien in Grand-Mère, Le Réveil in Louiseville, La Sentinelle in La Tuque, Les Cheneaux in Trois-Rivières, Le Drapeau in Berthierville and L'Industrie in Arvida, Jonquière, Kénogami. In 1949, he started his own printing business.

He independently owned a service station in the Christ-Roi neighborhood in Shawinigan, at the corner of boulevard Saint-Sacrement and avenue St-Prosper (across from Alcan's aluminum plant #2), and was an advocate of buying locally. Foucher would use his newspaper to advertise lower prices on gas.

He ran for mayor in the special election that was held in February, 1957 to fill the vacancy caused by the resignation of mayor Gaston Hardy and won. He was re-elected, unopposed, in the regular election of November, 1957. He was re-elected in the election of November, 1960. He resigned in August, 1963 before the end of his second term. The city council appointed Henri Désaulniers to succeed him.

Under his administration, the annexation of Shawinigan-Est was completed and the following facilities were established:

- The federal Post Office (395, avenue de la Station);
- The Shawinigan Bridge, dedicated on Sunday, September 2, 1962, in the presence of Premier Jean Lesage and Roman Catholic Bishop Georges-Léon Pelletier;
- The Marc-Trudel Bridge (another link between Shawinigan and Shawinigan-Sud across the Saint-Maurice River);
- Several playgrounds.

He died on May 15, 1976, in Shawinigan.

Rue Foucher in the Shawinigan-Nord neighbourhood was named to honour him. The Parc industriel J.-Armand-Foucher was also named after him in 2008.

== See also ==
- Mayors of Shawinigan

Political offices
Preceded by Gaston Hardy	Mayors of Shawinigan; 1957–1963	Succeeded by Henri Désaulniers
