= List of Russian navy flags =

This is a List of naval flags of the Russian Federation, from independence from the Soviet Union in 1991 onward, for Soviet naval flags see List of USSR navy flags.

== Jack ==
| Flag | Dates of use or adoption | Name |
|---|---|---|
| | 21 July 1992 — 29 December 2000 | Jack and fortress flag |
| | Since 29 December 2000 | Jack and fortress flag |
| | 21 May 1993 — 1 September 2008 | Jack of first- and second-rank ships of the Border Guard Force of the Russian Federation |
| | Since 1 September 2008 | Jack of first- and second-rank ships of border forces |

== Naval Ensign (National naval flag) ==
=== Navy flag ===
| Flag | Dates of use or adoption | Name |
|---|---|---|
| | 21 July 1992 — 29 December 2000 | Naval flag |
| | Since 29 December 2000 | Naval flag |
| | 21 July 1992 — 29 December 2000 | Guards naval flag |
| | Since 29 December 2000 | Guards naval flag |
| | 21 July 1992 — 29 December 2000 | Order naval flag |
| | 29 December 2000 — 23 July 2021 | Order naval flag |
| | Since 23 July 2021 | Order naval flag |
| | 21 July 1992 — 29 December 2000 | Guards order naval flag |
| | 29 December 2000 — 23 July 2021 | Guards order naval flag |
| | Since 23 July 2021 | Guards order naval flag |
| | Since 23 July 2021 | St. George's naval flag |
| | Since 23 July 2021 | St. George's guards naval flag |
| | Since 23 July 2021 | St. George's order naval flag |
| | Since 23 July 2021 | St. George's guards order naval flag |

=== Ensigns of auxiliary vessels of the Navy ===
| Flag | Dates of use or adoption | Name |
|---|---|---|
| | 21 July 1992 — 29 December 2000 | Flag of vessels and boats of the Auxiliary Fleet of the Navy |
| | Since 29 December 2000 | Flag of vessels and boats of the Auxiliary Fleet of the Navy |
| | 21 July 1992 — 29 December 2000 | Flag of hydrographic vessels of the Navy |
| | Since 29 December 2000 | Flag of hydrographic vessels of the Navy |
| | 21 July 1992 — 29 December 2000 | Flag of rescue vessels (boats) of the Navy |
| | Since 29 December 2000 | Flag of rescue vessels (boats) of the Navy |

=== Naval flag of the National Guard Forces Command ===
| Flag | Dates of use or adoption | Name |
|---|---|---|
| | 21 July 1992 — 29 December 2000 | Naval flag of ships (boats) and vessels of the Interior Troops |
| | 29 December 2000 — 30 December 2019 | Naval flag of ships (boats) and vessels of the Interior Troops (until 2016), National Guard (from 2016) |
| | Since 30 December 2019 | Naval flag of ships (boats) and vessels of the National Guard |

=== Flags of ships of Border Guard Force ===
| Flag | Date | Name |
|---|---|---|
| | 21 May 1993 — 1 September 2008 | Flag of ships, boats and vessels of the Border Guard Force of the Russian Federation |
| | Since 1 September 2008 | Flag of the ships, boats and vessels of border bodies service |
| | 21 May 1993 — 1 September 2008 | Order flag of ships, boats, and vessels of the Border Guard Force |

== Flags of officials ==
=== Flags of commanders-in-chief of the Armed Forces ===
| Flag, dates of use or adoption | | Name |
|---|---|---|
| | | Flag of defence minister of the Russian Federation |
| 1992 — 29 December 2000 | Since 29 December 2000 | Flag of defence minister of the Russian Federation |
| | | Flag of the chief of the General Staff of the Armed Forces |
| 1992 — 29 December 2000 | Since 29 December 2000 | Flag of the chief of the General Staff of the Armed Forces |

=== Flags of officials of the Navy ===
| Flag, dates of use or adoption | | Name |
|---|---|---|
| | | Flag of Navy commander-in-chief |
| 21 July 1992 — 29 December 2000 | Since 29 December 2000 | Flag of Navy commander-in-chief |
| | | Flag of the chief of the Main Naval Staff |
| 21 July 1992 — 29 December 2000 | Since 29 December 2000 | Flag of the chief of the Main Naval Staff |
| | | Flag of fleet commanders |
| 21 July 1992 — 29 December 2000 | Since 29 December 2000 | Flag of fleet commanders |
| | | Flag of flotilla or squadron commanders |
| 21 July 1992 — 29 December 2000 | Since 29 December 2000 | Flag of flotilla or squadron commanders |
| | | Flag of task force commanders |
| 21 July 1992 — 29 December 2000 | Since 29 December 2000 | Flag of task force commanders |

=== Flags of officials of the Border Guard Force ===
| Flag | Dates of use or adoption | Name |
|---|---|---|
| | 21 May 1993 — 15 August 1994 | Flag of the commander of the Border Guard Force |
| | 15 August 1994 — 1 September 2008 | Flag of the Commander-in-chief of the Border Guard Force |
| | 21 May 1993 — 15 August 1994 | Flag of deputy commanders of the Border Guard Force |
| | 15 August 1994 — 1 September 2008 | Flag of the commander of naval forces of the Border Guard Force |
| | 21 May 1993 — 1 September 2008 | Flag of a border guard district commander |
| | 21 May 1993 — 1 September 2008 | Flag of the border guard district deputy commander for naval affairs |
| | 21 May 1993 — 1 September 2008 | Flag of border guard patrol craft task force commander |

=== Flags of officials of FSB ===
| Flag | Dates of use or adoption | Name |
|---|---|---|
| | Since 1 September 2008 | Flag of the director of the FSB |
| | Since 2 February 2009 | Flag of the head of Boundary service of the FSB |
| | Since 2 February 2009 | Flag of the head of department of a coast guard of the Boundary service of the FSB |
| | Since 2 February 2009 | Flag of the chief of boundary management of the FSB |
| | Since 2 February 2009 | Flag of the chief of service of boundary patrol ships of boundary management of the FSB |

=== Flags of officials of the National Guard ===
| Flag | Dates of use or adoption | Name |
|---|---|---|
| | Since 30 December 2019 | Flag of the Director of the Federal Service of the National Guard Troops — Commander-in-Chief of the National Guard |
| | Since 18 November 2020 | Flag of the First Deputy Director of the Federal Service of the National Guard Troops |
| | Since 18 November 2020 | Flag of the District Commander of the National Guard |
| | Since 18 November 2020 | Flag of the commander of the formation of the National Guard |
| | Since 18 November 2020 | Flag of the commander of the naval military unit of the National Guard |

== See also ==
- List of Russian flags
- List of Soviet navy flags
