= Naval ensign =

Maritime flag used by naval ships to denote their nationality

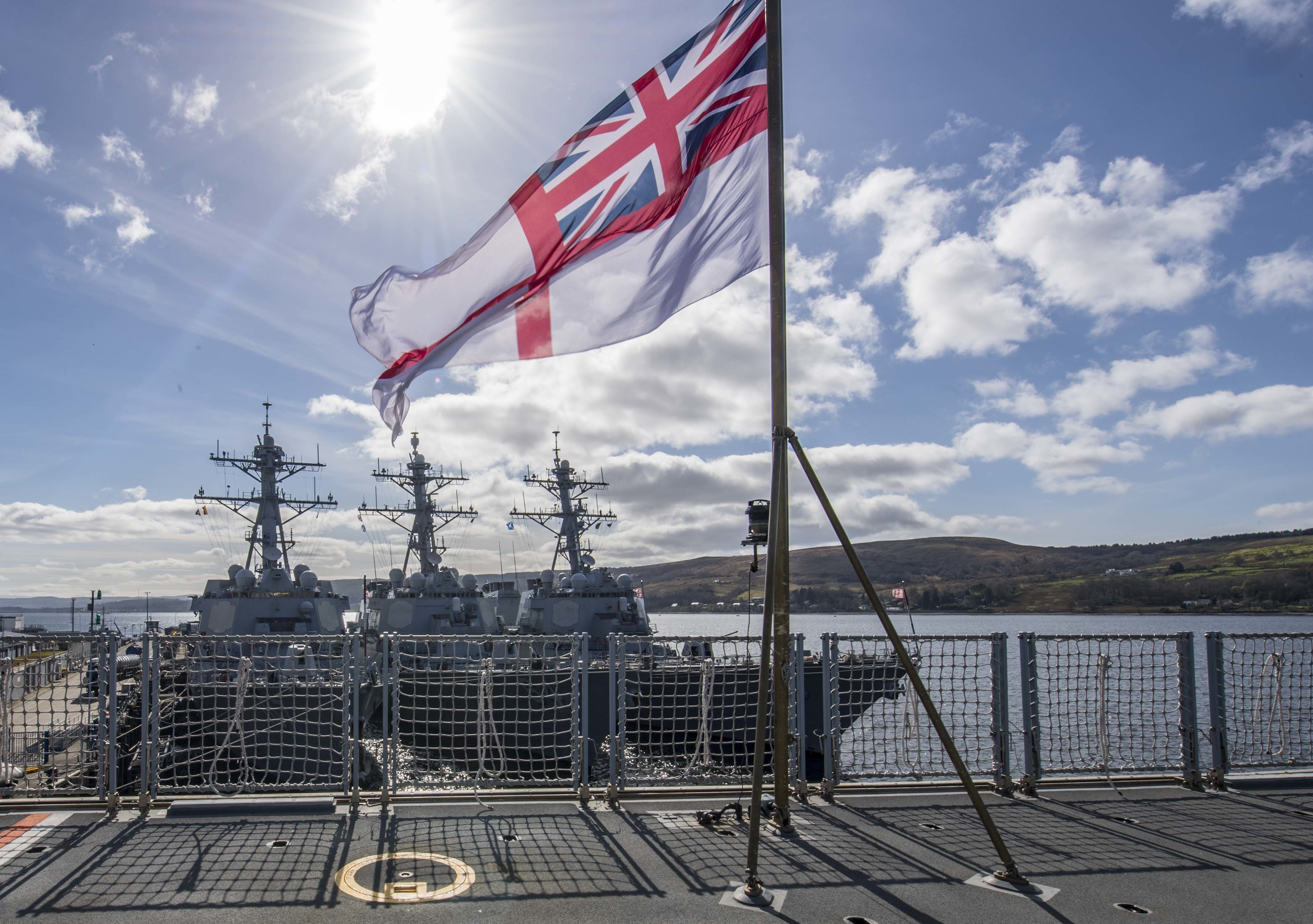
The British White Ensign flown from the stern of HMS Albion (L14)

A naval ensign is an ensign (maritime flag) used by naval ships of various countries to denote their nationality. It can be the same or different from a country's civil ensign or state ensign.

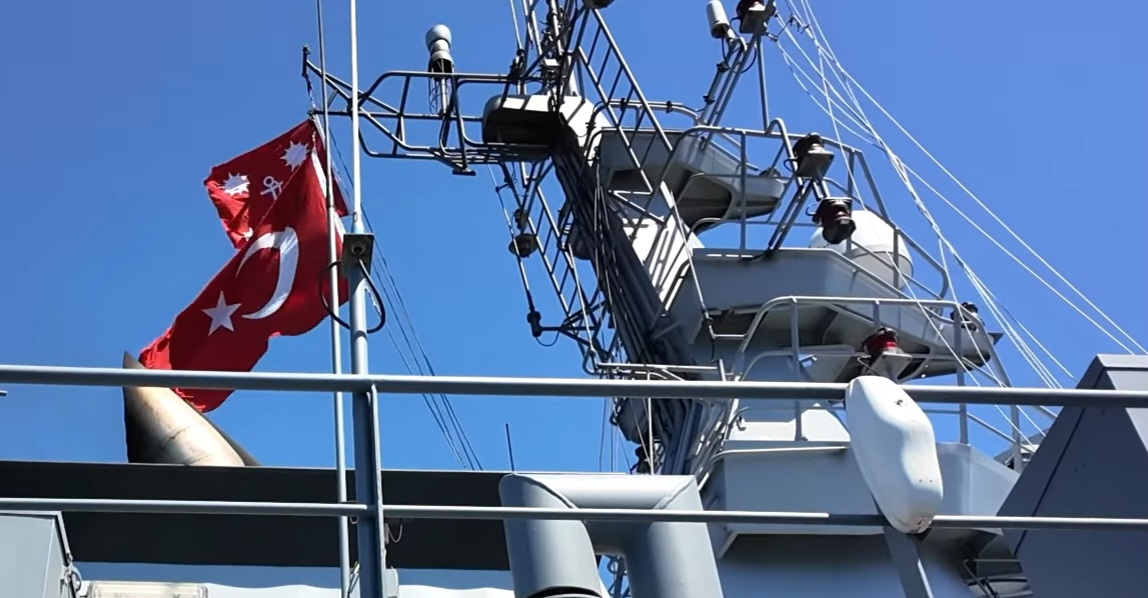
Naval ensign of Turkey

It can also be known as a war ensign. A large version of a naval ensign that is flown on a warship's mast just before going into battle is called a battle ensign. An ensign differs from a jack, which is flown from a jackstaff at the bow of a vessel.

Most countries have only one national flag and ensign for all purposes. In other countries, a distinction is made between the land flag and the civil, state and naval ensigns. The British ensigns, for example, differ from the flag used on land (the Union Flag) and have different versions of plain and defaced Red and Blue ensigns for civilian and state use, as well as the naval ensign (White Ensign). Some naval ensigns differ in shape from the national flag, such as the Nordic naval ensigns, which have 'tongues'. On the other hand, countries may also have different regulations and usage of naval ensigns, with some defining the naval ensign as a principal national flag at sea (under military context), while some others use naval ensigns as secondary standards denoting the services or as indication for the nature of authorized operations, as supplement but not a replacement of their primary national flags.

== Countries having specific naval ensigns ==
Naval ensigns that are different from the civil ensign and the national flag:

Abkhazia

Albania (Navy)

Albania (Coast Guard)

Algeria

Australia (details)

Azerbaijan (Navy)

Azerbaijan (Coast Guard)

The Bahamas

The Bahamas (naval auxiliary ships)

Bangladesh

Bangladesh (Coast Guard)

Barbados

Belgium

Bolivia

Brunei

Bulgaria

Bulgaria (Coast Guard)

Canada (details)

Canada (auxiliary vessels) (Note: While the name of the flag is Canadian Forces Auxiliary Vessels Jack, it is used as an ensign by auxiliary vessels.)

China

Colombia

Costa Rica

Croatia

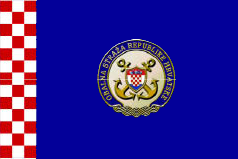
Croatia (Croatian Coast Guard)

Denmark

Dominican Republic

Egypt

Estonia

Fiji

Finland

France

Gambia

Georgia

Ghana

Germany

Grenada

Guyana

Greece (Coast Guard)

Honduras

Hungary

Iceland

India (details)

India (auxiliary ships)

India (Coast Guard)

Israel

Italy

Jamaica

Japan (details)

Japan (Coast Guard)

Jordan

Kazakhstan

Kenya

Latvia

Libya

Lithuania

Malaysia

Mauritius

Monaco

Montenegro

Morocco

Myanmar

Namibia

New Zealand (details)

Nigeria

North Korea

Norway

Oman

Pakistan

Papua New Guinea

Peru

Poland

Poland (naval auxiliary ships)

Poland (Coast Guard)

Russia (details)

Russia (naval auxiliary ships)

Russia (Coast Guard)

Saint Kitts and Nevis

Saudi Arabia

Serbia

Sierra Leone

Singapore

Solomon Islands

Somalia

Somaliland

South Africa

Sri Lanka

Sri Lanka (Coast Guard)

Sudan

Sweden

Thailand

Tonga

Trinidad and Tobago

Turkmenistan

Ukraine

Ukraine (Auxiliary ships)

Ukraine (Sea Guard)

United Kingdom (details)

United Kingdom (Auxiliary ships)

United Kingdom (Coast Guard)

United States (Coast Guard)

Uzbekistan

Vanuatu

Venezuela

Vietnam

Yemen

== Historical naval ensigns ==
Albania (1928–1934)

Albania (1946–1954)

Albania (1954–1958)

Albania (1958–1992)

Albania (Coast Guard)(1958–1992)

Argentina (1818–1820)

Argentina (1852-1861)

Austria-Hungary (1786–1914)

Austria-Hungary (1915–1918) - never formally flown by the navy

Austria (1926–1934)

Australia (1911–1967)

Belgium (1941–1950)

Bolivia (1966–2013)

British East Africa (1953–1962)

Brunei (1984–1990)

Bulgaria (1878–1944)

Bulgaria (1949–1955)

Bulgaria (1955–1990)

Bulgaria (1991–2005)

Burma (1948–1974)

Burma (1974–1994)

Byzantine Empire (1350–1453)

Canada (1910–1911)

Canada (1911–1965)

Colombia (1861–1890)

Qing Dynasty (1862–1889)

Qing Dynasty (1863) - proposed, but never adopted

Qing Dynasty (1889–1912)

Republic of China (1911)

Republic of China (Coast Guard) (1925-1928)

Collaborationist China (1942-1945)

China (1949-1992)

Ceylon (1950–1972)

Confederate States (1863–1865)

Croatia (1941–1944)

Croatia (1944–1945)

Czechoslovakia (1935–1939) (1945–1955)

Czechoslovakia (1955–1960)

Egypt (1922-1953) and Egypt (1953–1958)

Principality of Elba (1814–1815)

Ethiopia (1955–1974)

Ethiopia (1974–1975)

Ethiopia (1975–1996)

Finland (1918–1920)

Finland (1920–1978)

France (?–1789, 1814–1815, 1830)

France (1790–1794)

French Algeria (1848–1910)

French Cochinchina (1868–1945)

French Indochina (1923-1949)

Georgia (1997–2004)

Georgia (2004-2008)

Teutonic Order (12th Century)

Holy Roman Empire (1200-1350)

Holy Roman Empire (15th Century)

Holy Roman Empire (15th Century)

Brandenburg (1650-1694)

Prussia (1816-1819)

Prussia (1819–1867)

German Confederation (1848–1852)

North German Confederation and later Germany (1867–1892)

Germany (1892–1903)

Germany (1903–1918)

Germany (1919–1921)

Germany (1921-1933)

Germany (1933–1935)

Germany (1935–1938)

Germany (1938–1945)

Allied-occupied Germany (1945–1947)

East Germany (1960–1990)

East Germany (auxiliary ships) (1960-1990)

Ghana (1964–1966)

Greece (1833-1858)

Greece (1858–1862)

Greece (1863-1924 and 1935–1970)

Greece (1935)

Hawaiian Kingdom (1887)

Hungary (1919)

Hungary (1921–1939)

Hungary (1939–1945)

Hungary (1946–1948)

Hungary (1948–1950)

Hungary (1950–1955)

Hungary (1955–1957)

Hungary (1957–1991)

Iceland (1918–1944)

India (1879–1928)

India (1928–1950)

India (1950–2001)

India (2001–2004)

India (2004–2014)

India (2014–2022)

Achaemenid Empire (525 BC-330 BC)

Afsharid Empire (1736–1796)

Persia (1852-1906)

Persia (1906-1933)

Persia and later Iran (1933-1964)

Iran (1964–1979)

Iran (1979–1980)

Italy (1861-1946)

Italian Social Republic (1943-1945)

Italy (1947-2013)

Tokugawa Shogunate (1800s-1868)

Japan (1889–1945)

Japan (1952-1954)

Libya (1977–2011)

Lithuania (1927–1940)

Louisiana (1861)

Malaya (1895–1946)

Malaya (1957–1963)

Malaya (1963–1968)

Manchukuo (1932-1945)

Massachusetts (1776-1780)

Netherlands (1795–1806)

New Granada (1834–1861)

New South Wales (1831-1883)

New Zealand (1941-1968)

Nigeria (1960–1998)

Norway (1844–1905)

Pennsylvania (1775-1783)

Poland (1815–1867)

Poland (1919-1928)

Poland (River Fleet) (1930-1938)

Poland (River Fleet) (1938-1939)

Poland (1946–1993)

Poland (Auxiliary ships) (1955–1996)

Poland (Coast Guard) (1953–1990)

Portugal (1830–1911)

Romania (1922–1947)

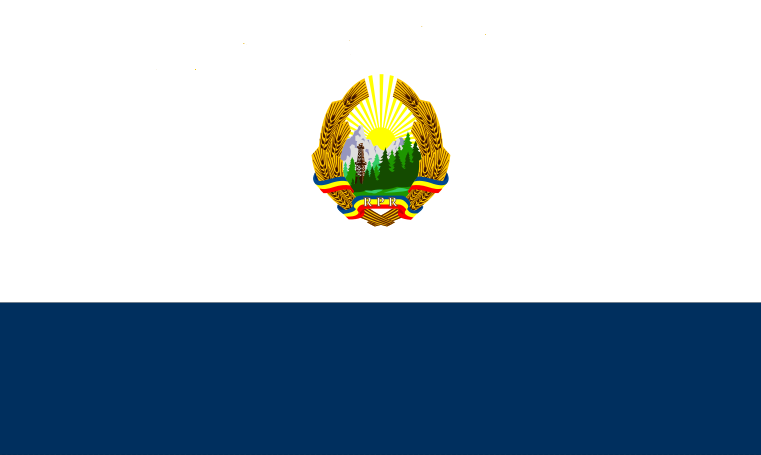
Romania (1948–1952)

Romania (1952–1965)

Sardinia (1785–1802)

Sardinia (1802-1814)

Sardinia (1814-1816)

Sardinia (1816–1848)

South Africa (1922-1946)

South Africa (1946–1951)

South Africa (1951–1952)

South Africa (1952–1959)

South Africa (1959–1981)

South Africa (1981–1994)

South Africa (1994–1998)

South Vietnam (1954–1975)

Spain (1701-1785)

Spanish Etiquette ensign (1701-1760)

Spanish Etiquette ensign (1760-1785)

Russian Soviet Federative Socialist Republic (1920-1923)

Soviet Union (1924–1935)

Soviet Union (1935–1950)

Soviet Union (1950-1991)

Russia (1992-2000)

Soviet Union (naval auxiliary ships) (1924–1935)

Soviet Union (naval auxiliary ships) (1935–1950)

Soviet Union (naval auxiliary ships) (1950-1992)

Russia (naval auxiliary ships) (1992-2000)

Soviet Union (Coast Guard) (1924–1935)

Soviet Union (coast Guard) (1935–1950)

Soviet Union (Coast Guard) (1950-1993)

Russia (Coast Guard) (1993-2008)

Serbia (1882–1918)

Sudan (1956–1970)

Sweden (1815–1844)

Sweden (1844–1905)

Siam (1910-1917)

Republic of Texas (1836–1838)

Grand Duchy of Tuscany (1500s-1737)

Tuscany (1737-1749)

Ukraine (1787)

Ukrainian People's Republic (1917–1921)

Ukrainian State (1918)

Ukrainian State (1918-1920) & (1992)

Black Sea Fleet of Russia and Ukraine (1992-1995)

Ukraine (1993)

Ukraine (1994–1997)

Ukraine (1997-2007)

Ukraine (Sea Guard) (1993-2001)

United Arab Republic (1958–1971)

Federation of Arab Republics (1972–1977)

Tudor Ensign (1485–1603)

Stuart Ensign (1620)

England (1620–1702)

Commonwealth of England (1649–1660)

White Squadron Ensign (1702–1707)

Kingdom of Scotland (1603-1707)

Great Britain (1707–1800)

Serapis flag (1779)

Republic of Venice (1400s–1797)

State of Slovenes, Croats, and Serbs and later Yugoslavia (1918–1922)

Yugoslavia (1922–1945)

Yugoslavia (1942)

Yugoslavia (1942-1944)

Yugoslavia (1943–1949)

Yugoslavia (1949–1992)

Yugoslavia and later Serbia and Montenegro (1993–2006)
