= Union Jack (disambiguation) =

The Union Jack, or Union Flag, is the flag of the United Kingdom.

Union Jack may also refer to:

- Union Jack of Sweden and Norway, a navy jack and consular flag (1844–1905)
- Jack of the United States, a navy jack

== Comics ==
- Union Jack (Marvel Comics), a fictional character in the Marvel Comics Universe
  - Union Jack (Joseph Chapman), the third incarnation of the character
- Union Jack Jackson, a character in the Warlord comic book

== Music and dance ==
- Union Jack (band), an English trance group
- Union Jack (ballet), a ballet by George Balanchine
- Union Jacks, album by The Babys
- Union JACK, a radio station in the United Kingdom.

== Periodicals ==
- Union Jack (American newspaper), a nationally-circulated monthly U.S. newspaper aimed at British expatriates, published from 1982 to July 2016.
- Union Jack (magazine), a UK story paper of the late 19th and early 20th century.

== Other uses ==
- Union Jack dress
- Union Jack Club, a London club for members of the British Armed Services
- Union Jack, a type of bet offered by UK bookmakers
- Union Jack, the name of a London bus company of the 1900s, originally called London Road Car Company
- Saluting the Union Jack
  - Formally means Naval salute
  - Informally means drinking (e.g., as described by Roger Sterling Mad Men, episode 3.6)
- Delias mysis, a butterfly of Australia, New Guinea and neighbouring islands
