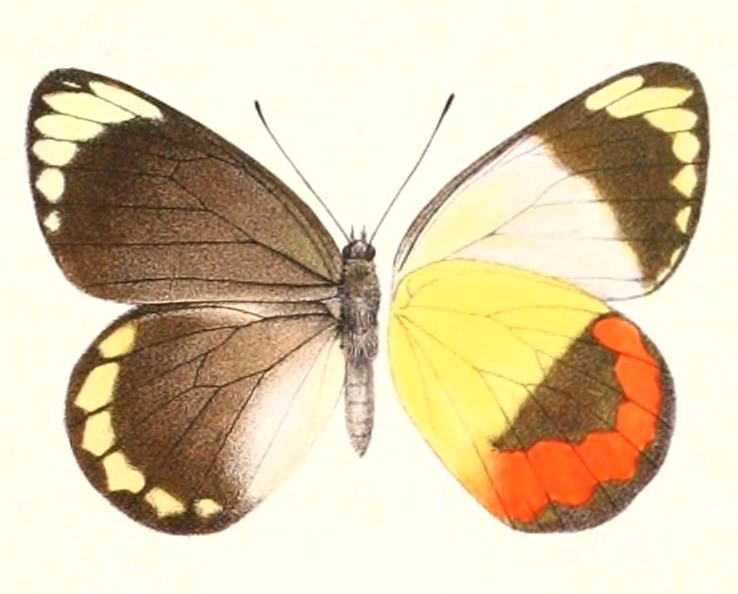

Scientific classification
- Kingdom: Animalia
- Phylum: Arthropoda
- Clade: Pancrustacea
- Class: Insecta
- Order: Lepidoptera
- Family: Pieridae
- Genus: Delias
- Species: D. euphemia

Binomial name
- Delias euphemia Grose-Smith, 1894

= Delias euphemia =

Species of butterfly

Delias euphemia is a butterfly in the family Pieridae. It was described by Henley Grose-Smith in 1894. It is found in the Australasian realm where it is endemic to Biak.

== Description ==
original Delias euphemia sp. nov. (PI. XII., tigs. 1 and 2.) Male. — Upperside: both wings white. Anterior wings with the costal margin narrow apex rather more broadly, and outer margin narrowly black, the black apex being indented between the veins, the black subapical band on the underside showing indistinctly through the wings. Posterior wings with the outer margin narrowly and towards the anal angle rather more broadly greyish black. Underside: anterior wings resemble Delias bagoe Boisd., but the subapical dark band inside the white spots extends rather further along the outer margin. On the posterior wings the submarginal band of red spots gradually narrows towards the apex, and the black band inside the spots is less arcuate towards the inner margin, ceasing between the lowest median nervule and the submedian nervure. The yellow basal area is more extended and comprises nearly the whole surface as far as the dark band. Female. — Upperside: both wings greyish brown, irrorated with grey scales towards the base, the abdominal fold of posterior wings being nearly white. Anterior wings with a subapical curved row of six lemon coloured spots, the second spot being the most elongated, the first and third of same size, the fourth and fifth smaller, and the sixth, the lowest, becoming obsolete. On the posterior wings is a submarginal row of six pale orange' coloured spots dentate outwardly, those nearest the anal angle smallest and least distinct. Underside: anterior wings resemble the female of D. bagoe, but the inner edge of the black band, which covers the apical half of the wings, is less irregular and not dentate; the basal half of the wings is dusky white, tinged with yellow towards the base. Posterior wings with the basal half bright yellow, the outer half brown black with a very broad submarginal band of confluent red spots widening towards the anal angle where the red colour gradually merges into the basal yellow. Expanse of wings : 3and 5/8 inches.Hab. Biak. Near D. bagoe Wall.; the principal difference consists in the row of orange spots on the posterior wings of the female of D. euphemia, which are not represented in that sex of D. bagoe. A series of two males and two females is in the collection.

Seitz- A species which forms a transition from mysis to bagoe, without the yellow subapical spot on the underside of the forewing of the latter. The wingspan is about 55–65 mm.

== Taxonomy ==
euphemia is a member of the hyparete species group.
