= Jack (flag) =

Banner flown from a ship's bow

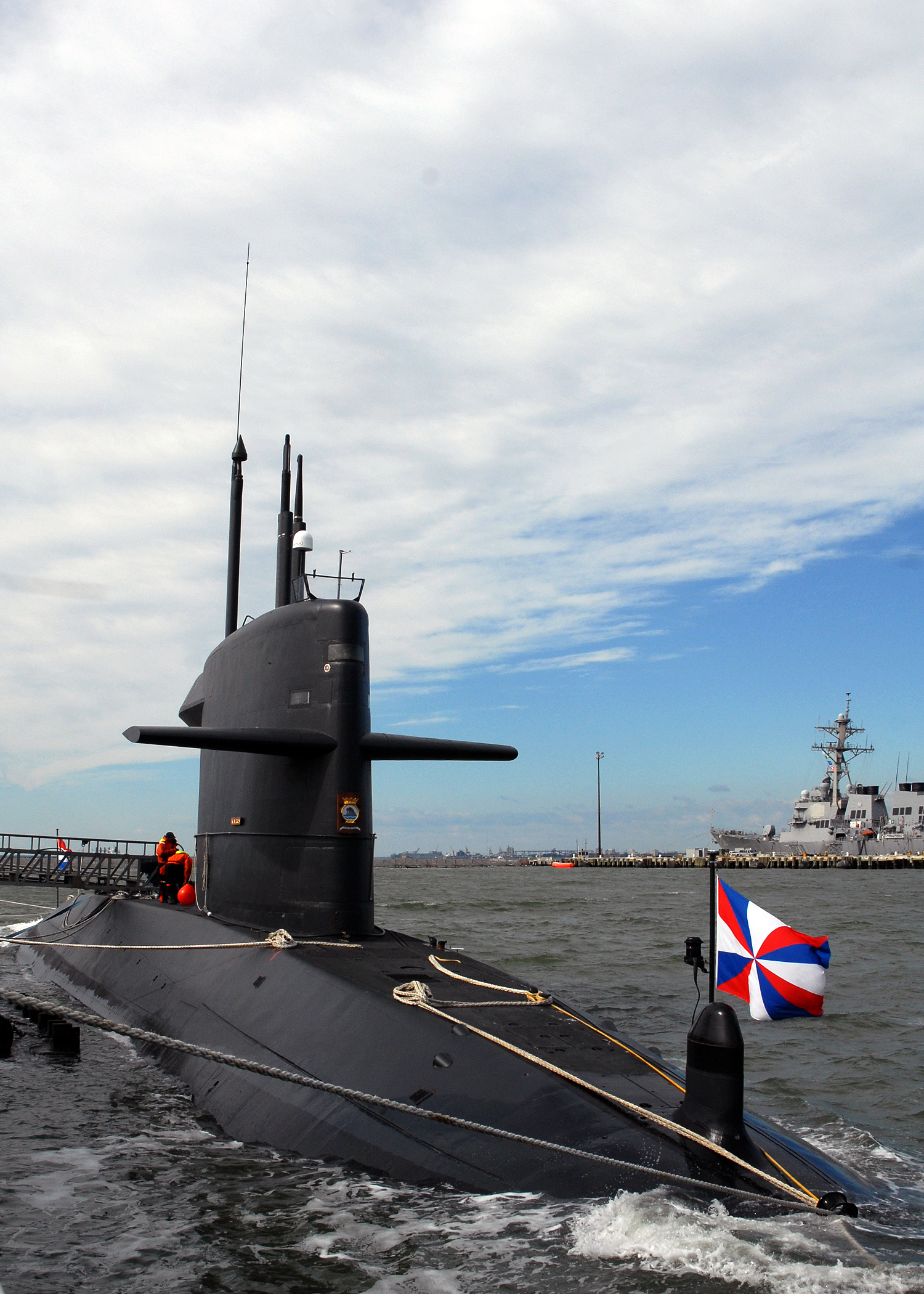
Royal Netherlands Navy jack on HNLMS Walrus (1985), 2008

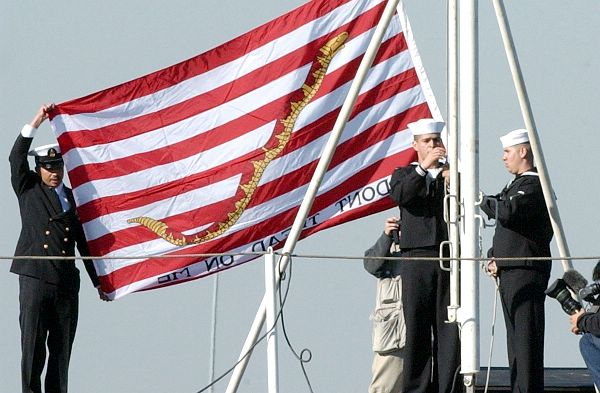
The US naval jack (2002–2019) being hoisted on USS Kitty Hawk's jackstaff in December 2001

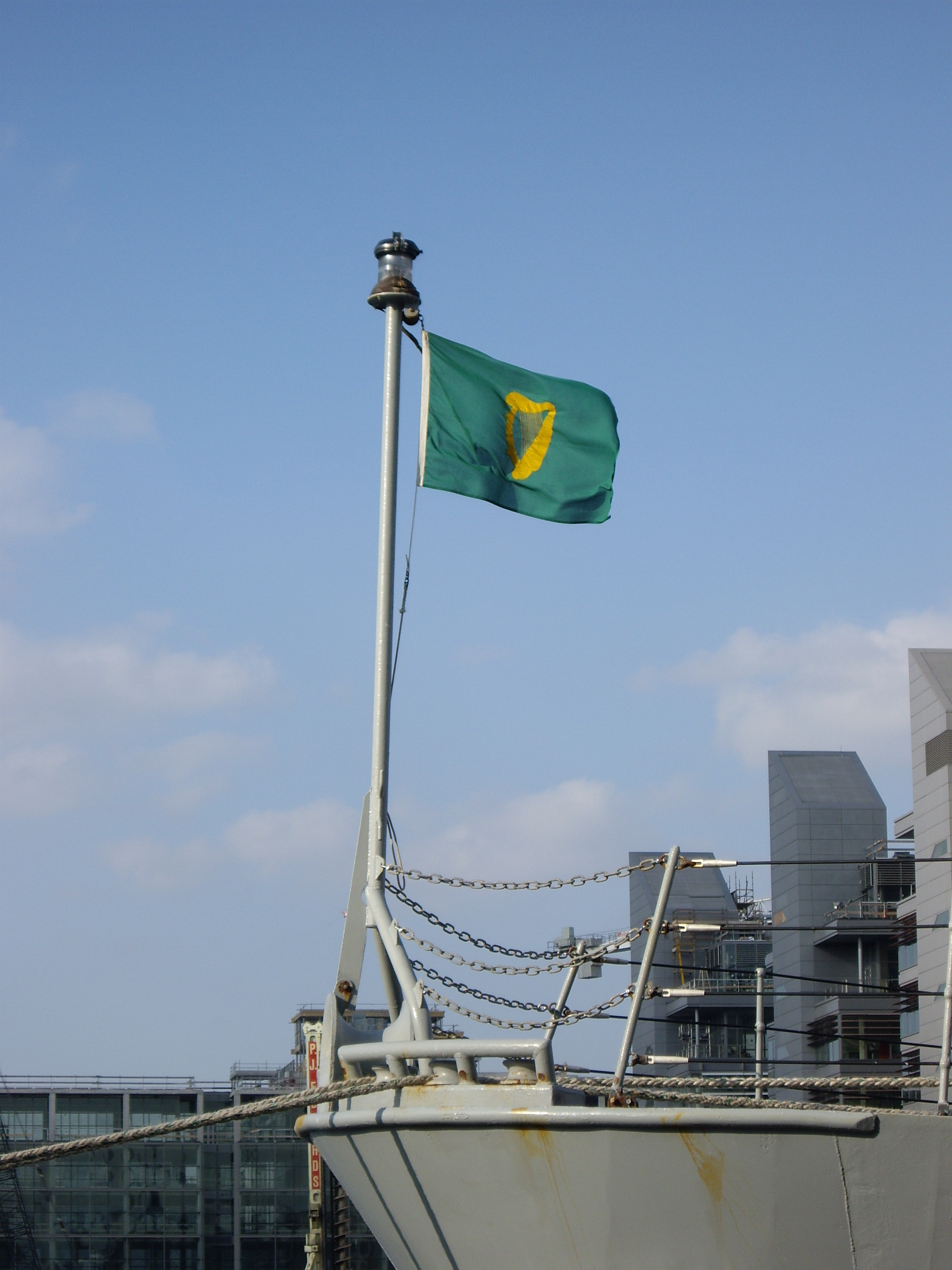
Naval jack of the Irish Naval Service

A jack is a flag flown from a short jackstaff at the bow (front) of a vessel, while the ensign is worn [flown] on the stern (rear). Jacks on bowsprits or foremasts appeared in the 17th century. A country may have different jacks for different purposes, especially when (as in the United Kingdom and the Netherlands) the naval jack is forbidden to other vessels. The United Kingdom has an official civil jack; the Netherlands has several unofficial ones. In some countries, ships of other government institutions may fly the naval jack, e.g. the ships of the United States Coast Guard and the National Oceanic and Atmospheric Administration in the case of the US jack. Certain organs of the UK's government have their own departmental jacks. Commercial or pleasure craft may fly the flag of an administrative division (state, province, land) or municipality at the bow. Merchant ships may fly a house flag. Yachts may fly a club burgee or officer's flag or the owner's private signal at the bow. Practice may be regulated by law, custom, or personal judgment.

== Etymology ==
"Jack" occupies 6 pages of the complete second edition of the Oxford English Dictionary and the use of the word in English goes back to the 14th century, appearing as a forename in Piers Plowman. Quite early on it was used as a name for a peasant or "a man of the lower orders". It continued the low class connotations in phrases such as "jack tar" for a common seaman, "every man jack", or the use of jack for the knave in cards. The diminutive form is also seen in "Jack of all trades, master of none", where Jack implies a poor tradesman, possibly not up to journeyman standard. The term was taken into inanimate objects and denoted a small (or occasionally inferior) component: jack-pit (a small mine shaft), jackplug (single pronged, low current), jack-shaft (intermediate or idler shaft), jack (in bowling: the small ball) or jack-engine (a donkey or barring engine). Incidentally, a jack is a garment for the upper body (quotes from 1375 onwards), a jacket is derived from this and is a small jack; not the other way around. As a further example of this usage, in 1686 Robert Plot writing about gins (i.e. horse engines) to pump water out of mines says: "they draw it [the water] up by Gin, which is made bigger, or less ... the less they call a Jack".

As a flag, "jack" followed this usage. A jack flag was a small flag, used to distinguish it from the large ensign or pennants. The OED mentions the theory of its derivation from James I or from a leathern jacket but dismisses both: "neither of these conjectures covers the early use of the word". Originally, the jack would have been flown from the bowsprit topmast head: "You are alsoe for this present service to keepe in yo^{r} Jack at yo^{r} Boultspritt end" (sailing instructions 1633 as quoted in OED2). In 1667 Samuel Pepys, naval administrator and diarist, recorded the Dutch taking the Royal Charles and a man "struck her flag and jacke" – clearly two different things. By 1692 the jackstaff had been developed to fly the jack: "Jack staff and Jack".

== Usage ==
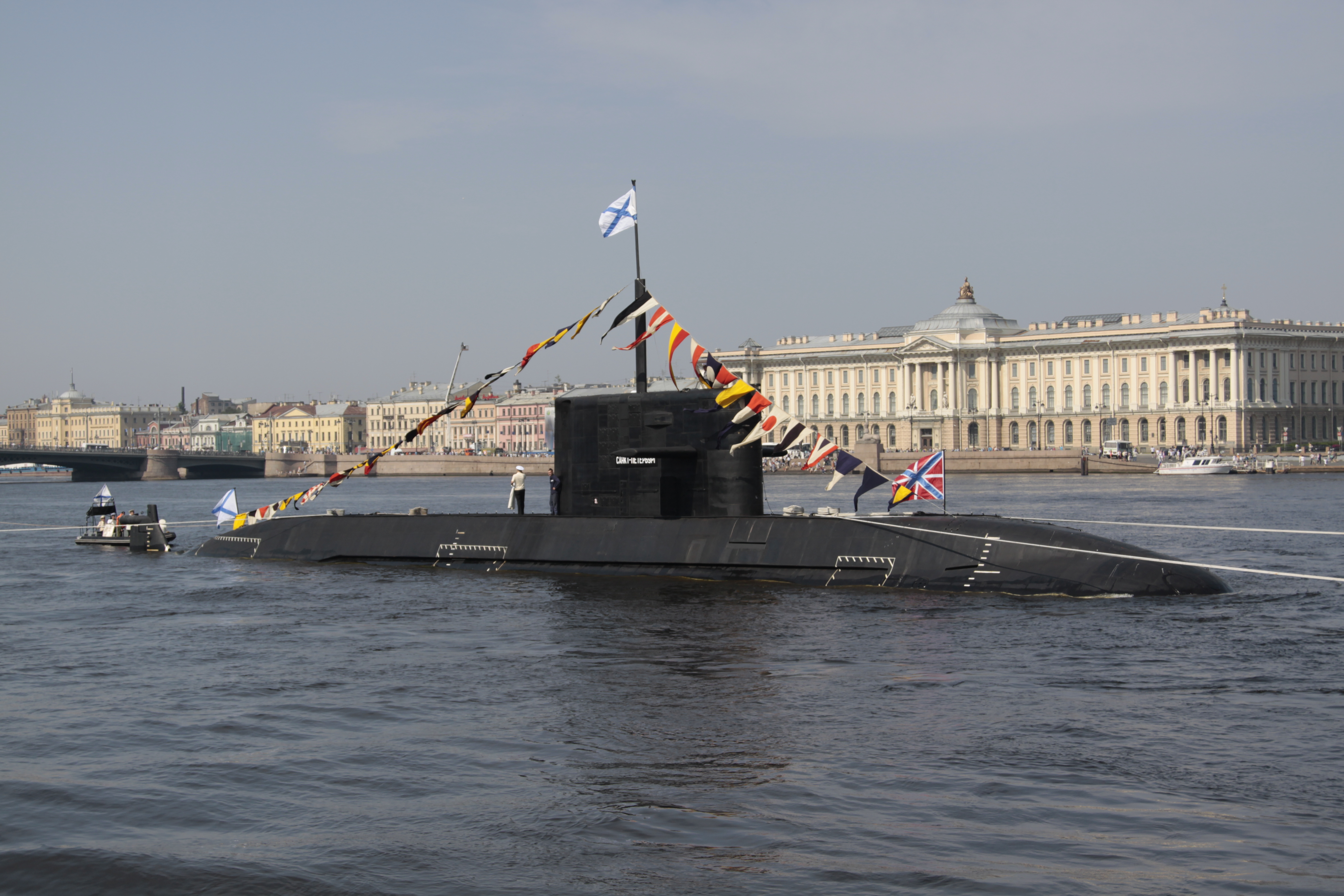
Russian Navy submarine Sankt Peterburg displaying the Russian naval jack at the bow and the naval ensign at the stern

A naval jack is usually flown when the ship is not under way, but is moored or at anchor, or when it is dressed overall on special occasions. The Union Jack of the Royal Navy must be run up when the first line is ashore when coming alongside. The same regulations are applied by the Royal Canadian Navy.

In the United States, the jack is also used as embroidered sleeve patches by the US Navy on its uniforms.

== Shapes and designs ==
Naval jacks are usually rectangular, often square, and smaller than the national ensign or war flag. Some countries fly a smaller version of the national or war flag, or its canton on its own. France and some other countries use the same flag or ensign for all purposes, civil or military, and also as their naval jack. Japan and some other countries with civil and war ensigns of different designs fly the civil ensign as a jack and the war ensign at the ship's stern. A shortened, square version of the national flag is used by some countries. A larger group of jacks show the country's national coat of arms, either as a banner of arms, or as a badge displayed on the field. Most countries have chosen a completely different design for their naval jacks, often with some national or maritime symbol, and usually with the same colours as in their flags.

== War ensign as jack ==
Countries that use their war ensign also as a jack will usually fly a smaller version at the bow.

Naval jack of Denmark

Naval jack of Egypt

Naval jack of Germany

Coast Guard jack of Iceland

Naval jack of Sweden

== War flag as jack ==
Naval jack of China

== Square version of national flag as jack ==
Naval jack of Belgium

Naval jack of Gabon

Naval jack of Norway

Naval jack of Romania (former)

Naval jack of Tunisia

== Canton of national ensign as jack ==
Naval jack of Chile

Naval jack of Greece

Naval jack of Liberia

Naval jack of the Republic of China

Naval jack of Tonga (former)

Naval jack of the United States, also flown by other federal government and civilian ships

== National coat of arms as jack ==
Naval jack of Colombia

Naval jack of Croatia

Naval jack of the Dominican Republic

Naval jack of Finland

Naval jack of Iran

Naval jack of Lithuania

Naval jack of Montenegro

Naval jack of Peru

Naval jack of Portugal

Naval jack of Spain

Naval jack of Ukraine in 1993

== National flag as jack ==
Naval jack of Antigua and Barbuda

Naval jack of Australia

Naval jack of the Bahamas

Naval jack of Bangladesh

Naval jack of Brunei

Naval jack of Canada (Note: Adopted as such in 2013.)

Naval jack of France

Naval jack of India

Naval jack of Japan

Naval jack of Malaysia

Naval jack of Myanmar

Naval jack of New Zealand

Naval jack of South Africa (Note: Was used as the naval ensign in 1994.)

Naval jack of Singapore

Naval jack of Sri Lanka

Naval jack of Turkey

Naval jack of Ukraine

Naval jack of the United Kingdom (i.e. the Union Jack)

Naval jack of Vietnam

== National flag in canton as jack ==
Naval jack of Algeria

Civil jack of the Bahamas

Naval jack of Canada from 1968 to 2013 (Note: Now used as the Canadian naval ensign.)

Naval Jack of Namibia

Naval jack of Romania

== Jacks of special design ==
Naval jack of Argentina

Naval jack of Bahrain (Note: Also used on land as the Royal Bahrain Naval Force's organizational flag.)

Naval jack of Bolivia

Naval jack of Brazil

Naval jack of Cambodia (Note: Also identical to the flag of the French protectorate of Cambodia.)

Canadian Coast Guard jack

Naval jack of Cuba

Naval jack of Cyprus

Naval jack of Ecuador

Naval jack of El Salvador

Naval jack of Indonesia

Naval jack of Ireland

Naval jack of Italy (Note: Also includes the arms of Venice, Genoa, Amalfi, and Pisa.)

Naval jack of Kazakhstan

Naval jack of North Korea

Naval jack of South Korea (Note: Also used on land as the South Korean navy's organizational flag.)

Naval jack of Kuwait

Naval jack of Lebanon

Naval jack of Malta

Naval jack of Mexico

Naval jack of Morocco

Naval jack (Prinsengeus) of the Royal Netherlands Navy (Kingdom of The Netherlands)

Netherlands (civil jack, unofficial, the most popular of several designs)

Naval jack of Oman

Naval jack of Pakistan

Naval jack of Panama

Naval jack of Paraguay

Naval jack of the Philippines

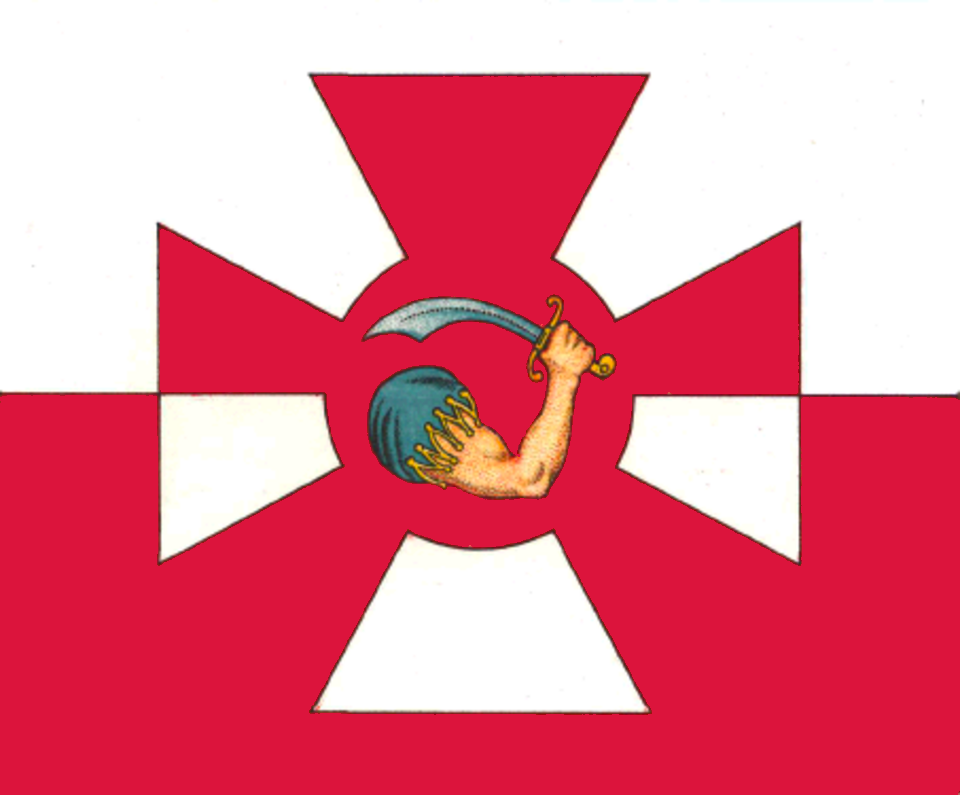
Naval jack of Poland

Naval jack of Saudi Arabia

Naval jack of Slovenia

Naval jack of the Soviet Union from 1932 to 1991

Naval jack of Thailand

Civil jack of the United Kingdom

Naval jack of the United States in 1776 and 1777

Naval jack of the United States from 2002 to 2019

Naval jack of Uruguay

Naval jack of Venezuela

== Cross and Saltire Jacks ==
Naval jack of Bulgaria

Naval jack of Estonia

Naval jack of Georgia from 2004 to 2009

Naval jack of Latvia

Naval jack of Russia

== Union jacks ==
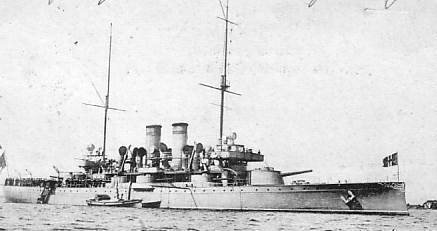
Union Jack of Sweden and Norway flown by Swedish armored cruiser Wasa in 1903

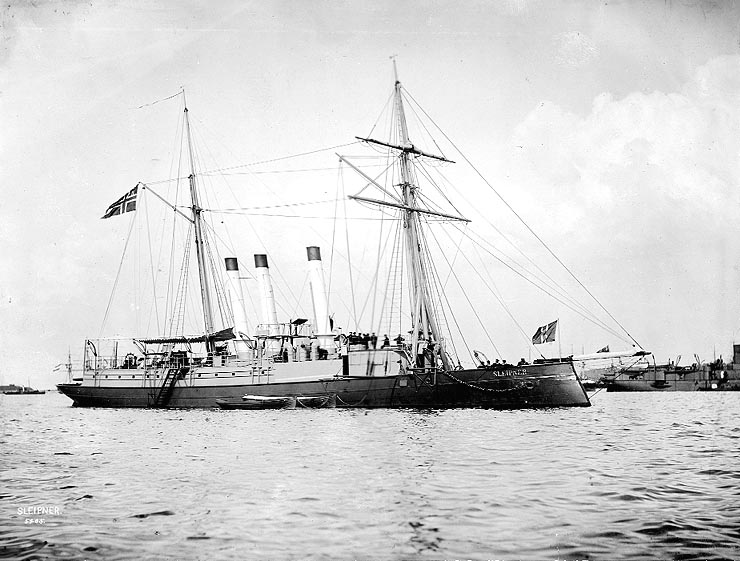
Norwegian gunboat Sleipner at Kiel, June 1895, flying the Union Jack of Sweden and Norway

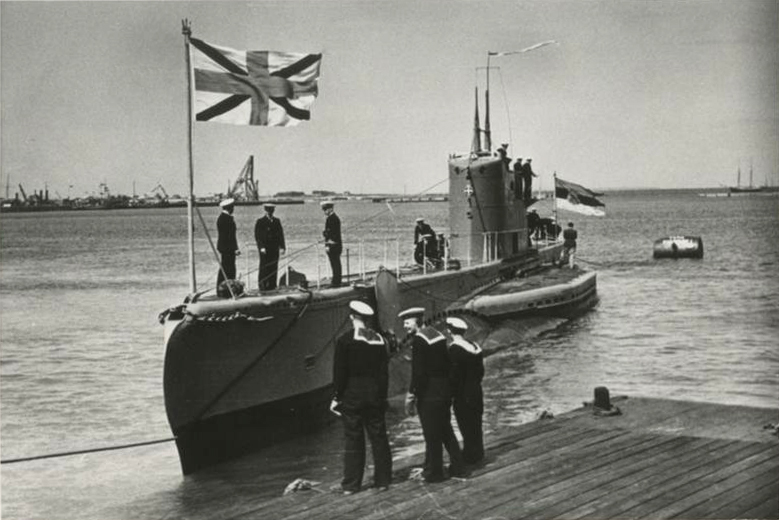
Submarine Kalev of the Estonian Navy flying the cross and saltire jack at the bow (Tallinn, 1939)

United or confederated states have in many cases adopted a jack representing their national union. The best known is the Union Jack of the United Kingdom's Royal Navy, composed in 1606 by joining the flags of England and Scotland. When the Kingdom of Ireland merged with Great Britain in 1801, a red saltire (Saint Patrick's Cross) was added to form the present Union Flag. The design of the UK's Union Jack probably inspired later jacks of other states, such as Russia, the Sweden-Norway, Estonia, and Latvia. The Russian jack in its turn inspired the jack of Bulgaria.

From 1777 to 1975, 1977 to September 2002, and June 2019 to the present, the United States Navy has flown a "union jack", consisting of the blue canton with white stars from the US national ensign. In 1975 and 1976, and then again from September 11, 2002, to June 4, 2019, the US Navy flew the First Navy Jack, allegedly used in 1775 and 1776, with a rattlesnake and the motto "DONT TREAD ON ME" [sic] superimposed on thirteen alternating red and white stripes.

The Confederate States of America followed the same pattern for its first naval jack (1861–1863), using the canton of its first naval ensign, with seven stars forming a circle on a "medium blue" field. Later versions had up to fifteen stars. The second Confederate naval jack was a rectangular cousin of the Confederate army's battle flag and was in use from 1863 until 1865.

The Union Jack of Sweden and Norway (1844–1905) was a rectangular cross flag divided per saltire, combining the national colours of Sweden (hoist and fly) and Norway (top and bottom). The naval jack was also used as a flag for the common diplomatic representations abroad.

The Union Jack of the United Kingdom

Naval jack of the United States from 1960 to 1975, 1977 to 2002, and 2019 to the present (identical to the canton in the national flag or ensign of that period)

Naval jack of the Confederate States from 1861 to 1863

Naval jack of Sweden and Norway from 1844 to 1905

Naval jack of the Confederate States from 1863 to 1865

== See also ==
- British ensign
- Flag terminology
- Naval ensign
- Vexillology – the study of flags
