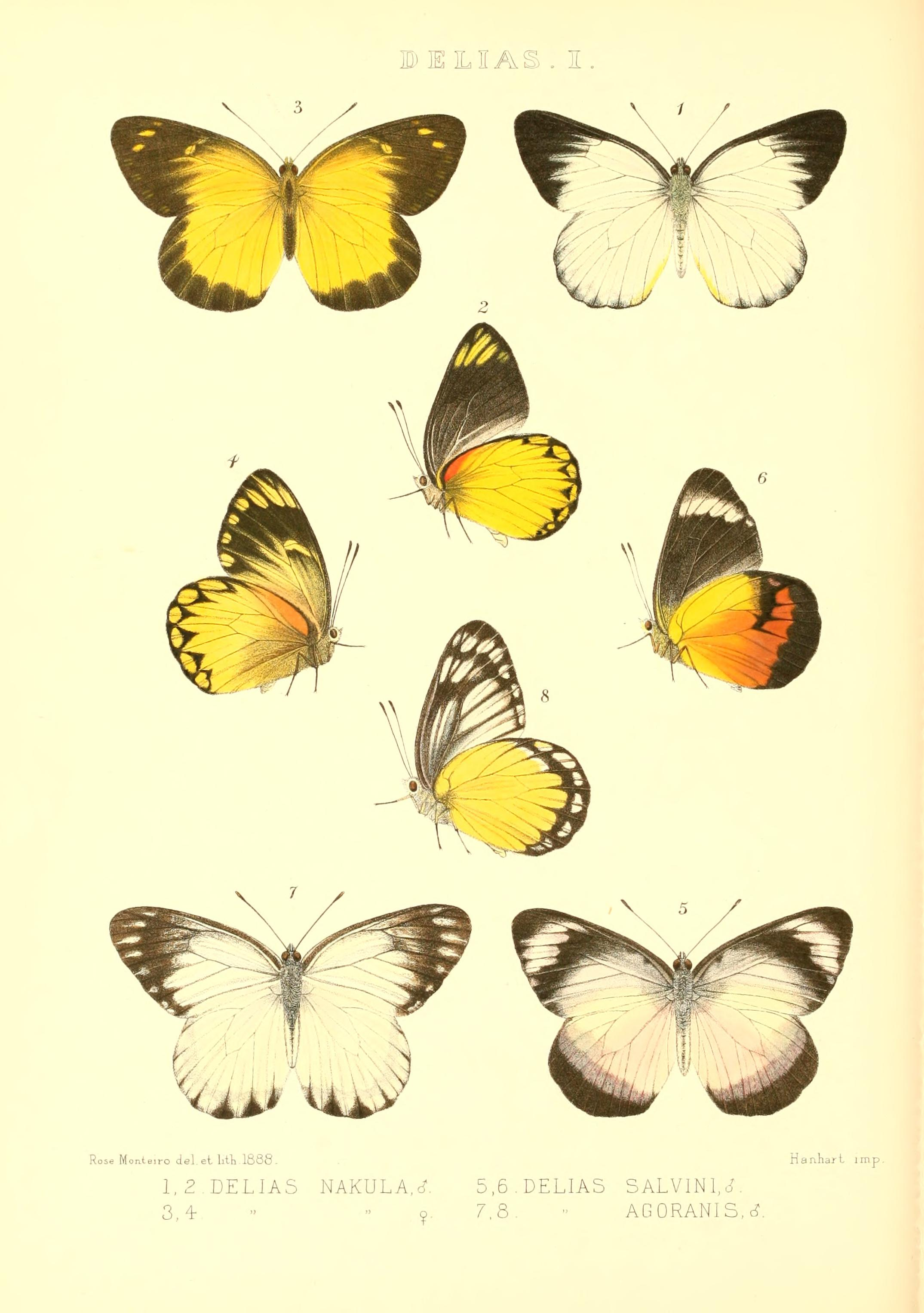
- In Henley Grose-Smith and William Forsell Kirby's Rhopalocera Exotica

Scientific classification
- Kingdom: Animalia
- Phylum: Arthropoda
- Clade: Pancrustacea
- Class: Insecta
- Order: Lepidoptera
- Family: Pieridae
- Genus: Delias
- Species: D. salvini

Binomial name
- Delias salvini Butler, 1882

= Delias salvini =

Species of butterfly

Delias salvini is a butterfly in the family Pieridae. It was described by Arthur Gardiner Butler in 1882. It is endemic to New Britain (Australasian realm). The name honours Osbert Salvin.

== Description ==
Delias Salvini, sp. n. Male: Near to D. bagoe (=eurygania); but the primaries [forewings] on both surfaces with a small curved oblique subapical white band in place of the large sulphur-yellow patch of D. bagoé; the secondaries below with the crimson tapering submarginal band much more arched, so that its outer edge is almost parallel to the outer margm. Expanse of wings 65 millim.New Britain.

== Taxonomy ==
salvini is a member of the hyparete species group.
