= Flag of İzmir =

The flag of İzmir was a historical naval flag used to represent the city of İzmir (or Smyrna) in the Ottoman period. It was used from the 17th to the 20th century.

== Gallery ==
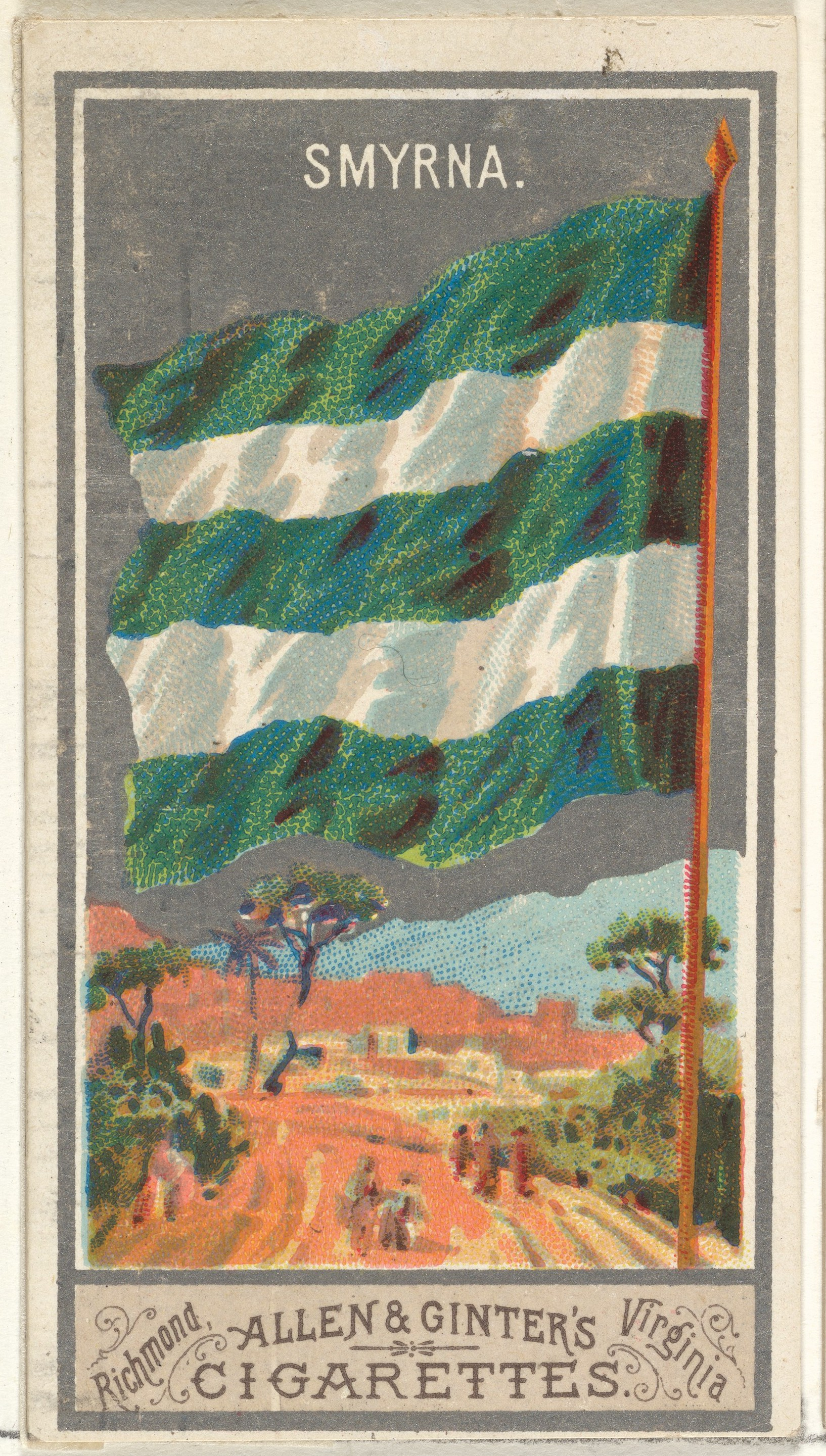
Flag of İzmir from Allen & Ginter Cigarettes Brands

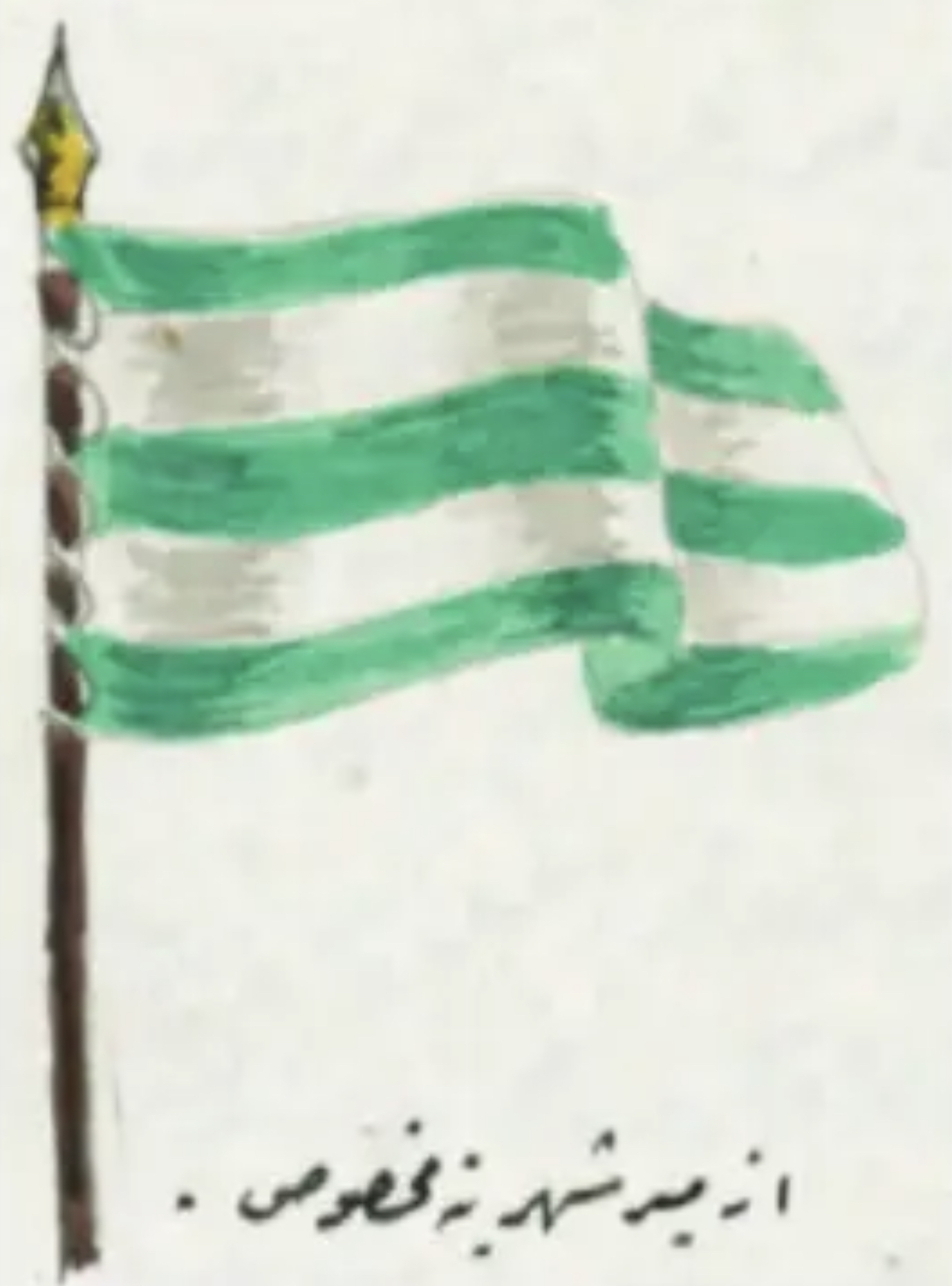
The İzmir flag used in the Feth-i Celîl-i Konstantıniyye book, 1903

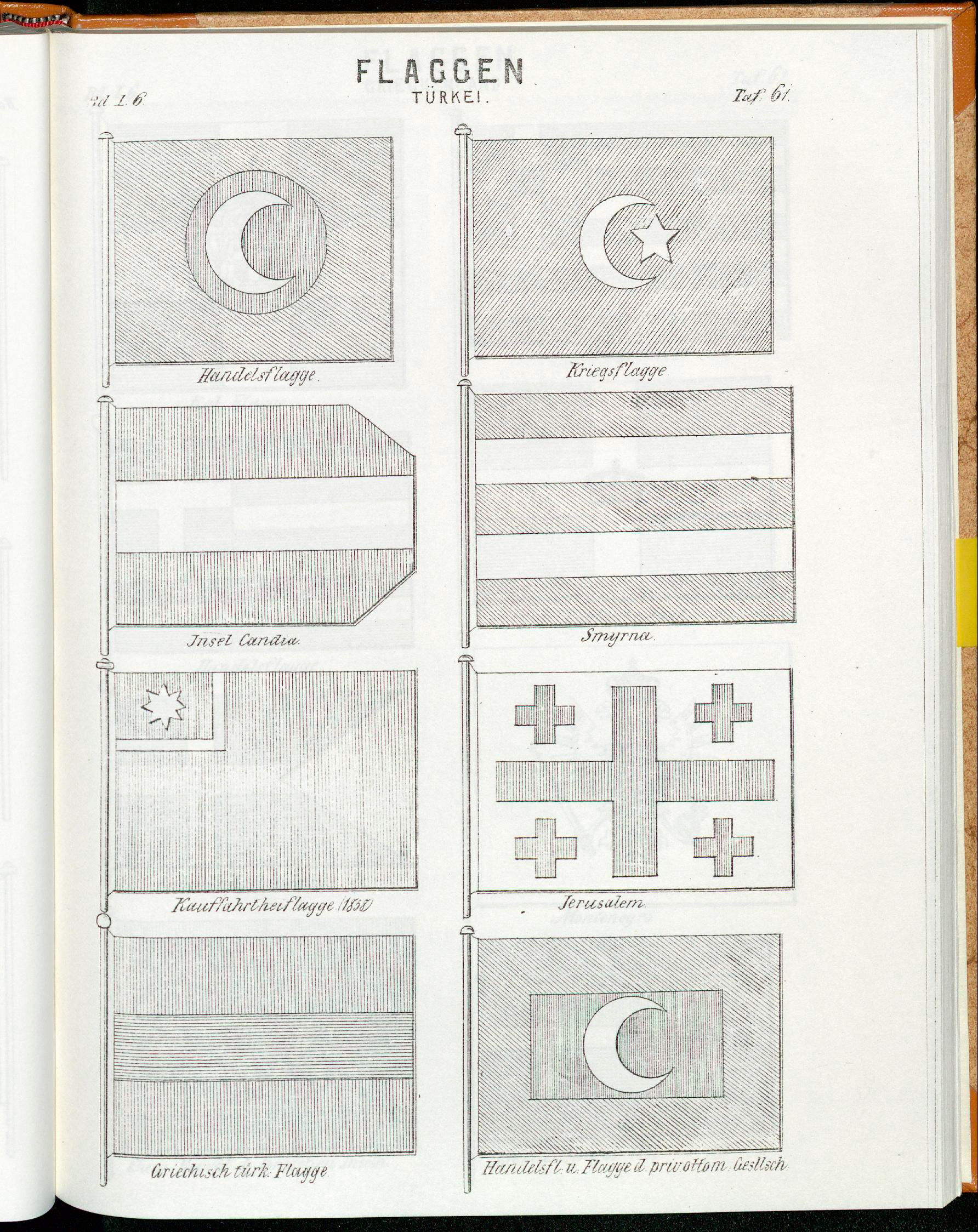
German source dated 1858 showing Ottoman flags
