= Union Jack of Sweden and Norway =

Swedish-Norwegian naval flag

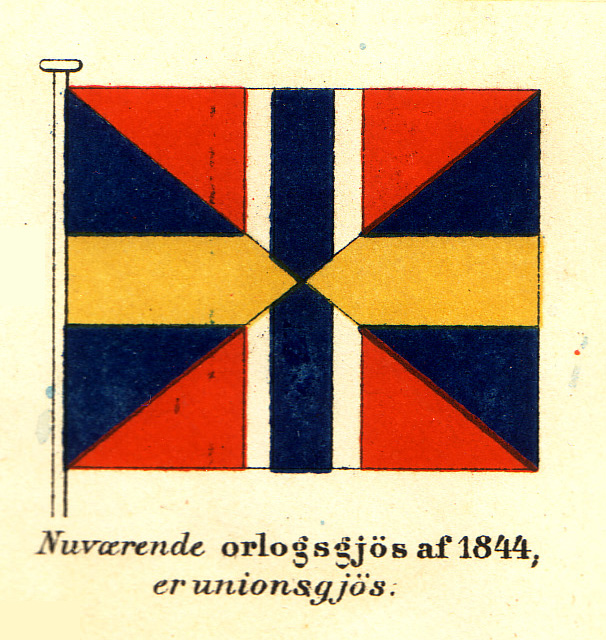
The union jack and diplomatic flag of Sweden and Norway 1844–1905. The proportions 4:5 were those of the union mark in Swedish flags.

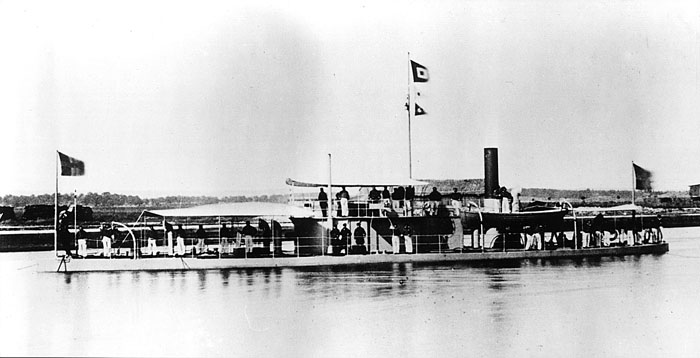
Swedish monitor HSwMS Sölve with union jack on the bow

The Union Jack of Sweden and Norway (unionsgös in Swedish, unionsgjøs in Norwegian) was the common naval jack of Swedish and Norwegian warships between 1844 and 1905, during the last six decades of the Union between Sweden and Norway. It was also the flag of diplomatic stations and consulates abroad, common to both states.

== The union mark ==
The union jack was identical to the Swedish version of the union mark of Sweden and Norway. It combined the flag colours of both kingdoms, displayed in triangular fields generated by dividing a square or rectangle per saltire. The mark was inserted in the canton of all flags in both countries to symbolize their partnership in the union of 1814. Both countries had Nordic cross flags, but of different proportions. The rectangles on the hoist side in Swedish flags had the proportions 4:5 and required a mark of the same shape, while Norwegian flags had squares on the hoist side, and hence a square union mark. As a result of the diagonal division, both nations’ colours were of equal area.

The union mark was introduced by royal order in council on 20 June 1844. It had been proposed by a joint committee from both countries, appointed in 1839 with the mandate of discussing the symbols of the Union to ensure that they would reflect the equal status of the two united kingdoms. The mark fulfilled this condition perfectly by its equal distribution of flag colours. The two countries were given separate, but parallel flag systems, clearly manifesting their equality.

The union mark remained in all flags of the two countries until the dissolution of the Union in 1905, except for the merchant and state flags of Norway. Due to increasing Norwegian dissatisfaction with the Union, it was removed from those flags in 1899. The 1814 Constitution of Norway stipulated that the war flag or ensign was to be a union flag, thereby preventing its removal from that flag. The union jack was still flown from the jackstaff in the bow of Norwegian warships until 9 June 1905, and by Swedish warships until 1 November 1905.

== See also ==
- Naval jack
- Maritime flags
- Nordic Cross Flag
- Union between Sweden and Norway
- Union mark of Sweden and Norway

== Literature ==
- Heimer, Zeljko; Engene, Jan Oskar (2005). "Unionstidens norske flagg – Norwegian Flags of the Union Period". In: Nordisk Flaggkontakt No. 40, pp. 33–49. ISSN 0109-7539
- Munksgaard, Jan Henrik (2012). "Flagget – Et nasjonalt symbol blir til". Kristiansand, Vest-Agder-museet. ISBN 978-82-91178-26-4
