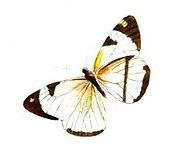

Scientific classification
- Kingdom: Animalia
- Phylum: Arthropoda
- Class: Insecta
- Order: Lepidoptera
- Family: Pieridae
- Genus: Delias
- Species: D. lara

Binomial name
- Delias lara (Boisduval, 1836)

Synonyms
- Pieris lara Boisduval, 1836; Delias maga Grose-Smith, 1897; Delias mysis goodenovii Rothschild, 1915; Delias mysis hideyoae Nakano, 1995; Delias mysis rosselliana Rothschild, 1915; Delias lara intermediata Mitis, 1983; Delias lara cruentata Butler, 1865; Delias lara onca Fruhstorfer, 1910; Delias lara maforensis Rothschild, 1915; Delias lara adelphoe Talbot, 1939

= Delias lara =

Species of butterfly

Delias lara is a butterfly in the family Pieridae. It was described by Jean Baptiste Boisduval in 1836. It is found in New Guinea.

== Description ==
Delias lara is closely related to Delias mysis but differs by the white not yellow subapical spots on the forewing recto.These are weakly developed and may be absent. On the verso the subapical spots are yellow and larger.mysis forms a transition to lara Bdv., from Dutch North-West New Guinea, from which it differs in having the red and black bands on the underside of both wings almost twice as broad.

The wingspan is about 60–70 mm (2.4–2.8 in).

== Subspecies ==
- D. l. lara (Waigeu, New Guinea, Mysol, Milne Bay, Numfor, Yule)
- D. l. hideyoae Nakano, 1995 (Japen island)
- D. l. goodenovii (Rothschild, 1915) (Goodenough islands)
- D. l. maga Grose-Smith, 1897 (Sud-Est island)
- D. l. rosselliana Rothschild, 1915 (Rossell islands)

== Taxonomy ==
lara is a member of the hyparete species group. In recent works lara is a junior synonym of mysis.
