= Gin pennant =

Maritime flag inviting officers to drink

One style of gin pennant.

The gin pennant (sometimes gin flag or drinking pennant) is a maritime flag. When flown aboard ship, it indicates an open invitation to other ships' officers to come aboard for drinks.

== Purpose and history ==
The gin pennant appeared at least as early as the 1940s, and possibly long before. Flying the gin pennant was an invitation (generally aimed at officers) to come aboard for a (free) drink in the ship's wardroom. (Consequently, junior officers would sometimes compete and conspire to fly the gin pennant aboard other ships.) Gin pennants likely originated in, and remain in use today, in the Commonwealth navies.

== Form ==
The gin pennant exists in several variants. Due to their rather informal nature, gin pennants may be improvised or customized from available flags and pennants. The simplest option is to fly the "starboard" manoeuvering signal pennant (a pennant with a white field, and green hoist and fly).

Purpose-made gin pennants often take the form of a starboard pennant defaced with a wine, cocktail, or martini glass (typically green, sometimes gray or black) on the field.

Another variant described is a small triangular flag in solid green, defaced with a white cocktail or wine glass.

Gin pennants have also been produced as novelties by distillers. In the 1950s, the makers of Gordon's Gin distributed Gordon's pennants in reversed colors: a green field with white hoist and fly, defaced with a gin bottle, glass, and the word GORDON'S.

Starboard signal pennant

Starboard pennant defaced with glass

Triangular variant
