= Swallowtail (flag) =

Flag with a V-shaped cut

Swallowtail flag shape

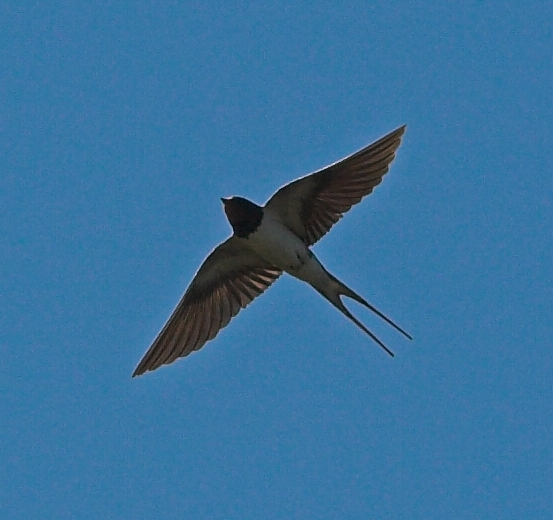
A barn swallow in flight. Note the shape of its tail

In flag terminology, a swallowtail is either

1. a V-shaped cut in a flag that causes the flag to end in two points at the fly; or
2. any flag that has this V-shaped cut.

The name comes from the forked tail that is a common feature of the swallow species of birds.

Alfa flag (nautical signal flag for "A")

Naval ensign of Poland

Naval ensign of Germany

Flag of the Vietnamese Pure Land Buddhist Laity Association

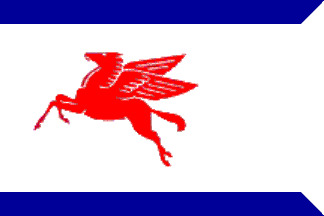
House flag of Socony-Vacuum Oil Company

A swallowtail can also be used to easily deface an existing flag as seen following World War II to both follow international maritime law that dictates a flagged vessel must fly the flag of registration from its stern, but that its use immediately following a war could suggest that the ship is unaware of the surrender or still under orders of the belligerent government.

As such, the Allied Control Council in Europe dictated that "every German or ex-German vessel operating under the Allied Control Authority shall at all times wear the Allied Control Authority distinguishing flag which shall consist of International Flag "C" with a triangle cut from the fly.", and Supreme Commander for the Allied Powers in Japan dictated Japanese vessels carry an "D" flag to acknowledge they had accepted Allied occupational authority.

"C-Pennant" (C-Doppelstander) as used during the occupation of Germany

Swallowtailed "D" ensign used during the occupation of Japan

== Variants ==
=== Double-pointed ===
Common in the Nordic countries, this swallowtail flag contains a vertical section in the centre of the fly.

Naval ensign of Denmark

State flag of Iceland

Presidential standard of Iceland

=== Swallowtail with tongue ===
Also common in the Nordic countries, the swallowtail flag contains a third tail (the "tongue") between the other two tails.

Naval ensign of Sweden

State flag of Norway

Naval ensign of Finland

Naval ensign of Estonia

=== Triangular swallowtail ===
The triangular swallowtail is the shape of the flag of the American state of Ohio, as well as of some burgees, private signals and pennants of the International Code of Signals (ICS).

State flag of Ohio

Burgee of the Detroit Yacht Club

International signal flag for "group"

=== Guidon ===
A guidon is the general name given to a small swallowtail flag. Guidons are used to represent military units and are displayed on vehicles attached to a particular unit. In some countries (such as the United States), guidons do not necessarily have a swallow tail.

The military use of the guidon originated from the flags used by cavalry units in Europe. A variant of the guidon, the hussar cut, was used by German cavalry regiments. Instead of a straight V-shaped cut, the swallowtail in a hussar cut flag is curved.

Guidon of the USA 7th Cavalry Regiment (19th century)

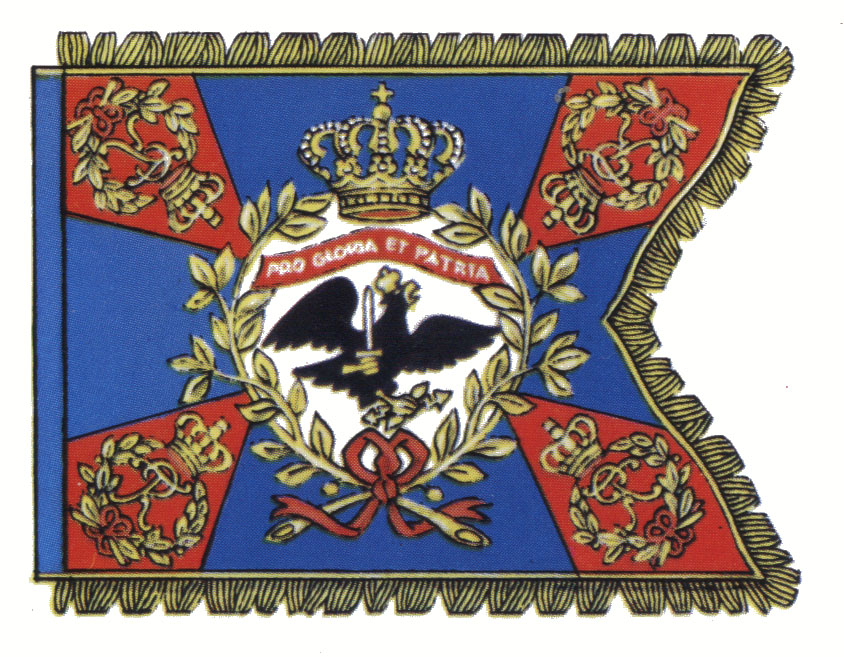
Prussian cavalry standard with hussar cut (18th century)
