= Pig stick =

A pig stick (occasionally pigstick or pig-stick) is a staff that carries a flag or pennant, usually the burgee of the boat owner's yacht club or private signal, above a mast of a sailboat. The pig stick is connected to a halyard so that when raised to the top of the mast, it extends above the mast, allowing the flag to be seen flying above the boat's sails. Pig sticks are especially useful on catboats and other sailboats which have no stays to which a flag halyard can be attached.
