= Private signal =

A private signal is a custom-designed flag used to symbolize and identify the owner of a boat. They generally have a swallowtail shape but may instead be rectangular or sometimes triangular. Private signal tradition is drawn from heraldry but typically does not incorporate as intricate designs as a coat of arms.

== Etiquette ==
A private signal may be hoisted while underway and at anchor, day or night, but not while racing. Power boats fly the owners' private signal at the top of the main-mast head or from a short staff on the bow called a bow staff. On a sailboat the private signal is flown using a pig stick hoisted to the top of the main-mast or mizzen-mast.

== History ==
From as far back as 4000 BC, Egyptian captains of the Nile would identify themselves to passing ships by placing a clay figurine atop their ships’ aftermost cabin.

The Romans used private signals quite often. At sea off Marseilles in 49 BC, the famous Roman Decimus Brutus hoisted his private signal during the Siege of Massilia. Primary documents say the Massilians recognized his “flamboyant” signal, so his ship narrowly escaped being rammed simultaneously by two triremes.

In the Middle Ages private signals were used extensively at sea. The Bayeux Tapestry of 1150 AD shows Mora, the ship of William, Duke of Normandy, as it flew a white banner, bordered in blue and bearing a golden cross. Other knights in the tapestry boast their own private signals.

== Gallery ==
Examples of private signals flown in the United States:

Personal burgee of Thatcher Stone

Personal burgee of Brierley

Personal burgee of Brady Brim-DeForest

== See also ==
- Civil flag
