= Union Jack (American newspaper) =

Newspaper in San Diego, California

- Type: Monthly
- Format: Tabloid
- Owner: Union Jack Newspaper Inc.
- Publisher: Ron and Jeff Choularton
- Editor-in-chief: Ron Choularton
- Founded: 1982
- Ceased publication: 2016
- Language: English
- Headquarters: La Mesa, California
- Circulation: 300,000 (2012)

The Union Jack was an American monthly newspaper featuring news from the United Kingdom and aimed at British expatriates. Published in La Mesa, California, it was established in 1982 and closed in 2016.

The Union Jack was the only nationally distributed newspaper for British expatriates in the United States. It was founded in 1982 by Ron Choularton, who had been a production executive at The Guardian, and his brother Jeff, who both moved to the United States in the late 1970s. Ron Choularton was the editor. The paper relied on display advertising rather than classifieds. A Canadian edition was launched under licence in Vancouver and Toronto in 2012; circulation was then 300,000 a month.

It ceased publication after the July 2016 issue.
