= Delias bagoe =

Scientific classification
- Kingdom: Animalia
- Phylum: Arthropoda
- Clade: Pancrustacea
- Class: Insecta
- Order: Lepidoptera
- Family: Pieridae
- Genus: Delias
- Species: D. bagoe

Binomial name
- Delias bagoe (Boisduval, 1832)

Species of butterfly

Delias bagoe is a member of the family Pieridae that lives in the Australasian realm. The caterpillars feed on Loranthaceae plants.

== Description ==
Upperside white, the apex of the forewings chrome yellow, margined with the black costa and outer margin and a curved band running from inside the cell to near the anal angle.The outer margin of the hindwings broadly black. Underside forewings chiefly black, yellow apical spot as on the upperside, the proximal end of the cell yellow, and the inner margin white. The hindwings at the basal half yellow, black towards the distal half, across the black a distinct band of crimson, which becomes orange where it meets the yellow near the inner margin.

== Distribution ==
New Ireland, Bismarck Archipelago, Duke of York Island, New Hanover

== Taxonomy ==
bagoe is a member of the hyparete species group.
