= Jackstaff =

Small vertical spar on the bow of a ship

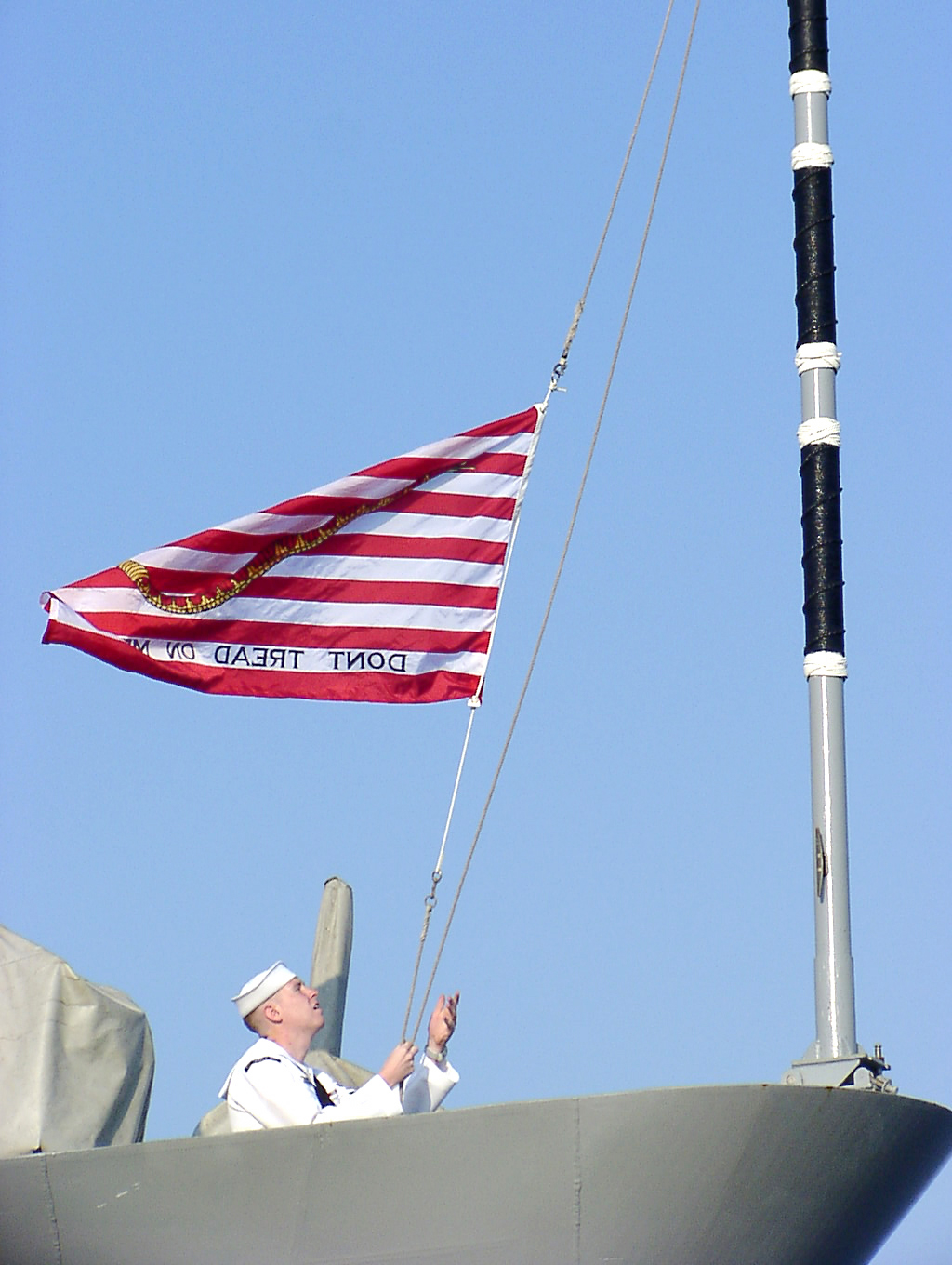
The US naval jack (2002–2019) being raised on a jackstaff in 2002

A jack staff (also spelled as jackstaff) is a small vertical spar (pole) on the bow of a ship or smaller vessel on which a particular type of flag, known as a jack, is flown. The jack staff was introduced in the 18th century.

A jack is typically flown from military vessels (including submarines) while at anchor or moored pierside, but not while underway. Civilian vessels (such as private yachts and sailboats) have been known to fly the jack of the nation of their homeport, also from a jack staff, while moored or at anchor.
