= Maritime flag =

Flag designated for use on ships or at sea

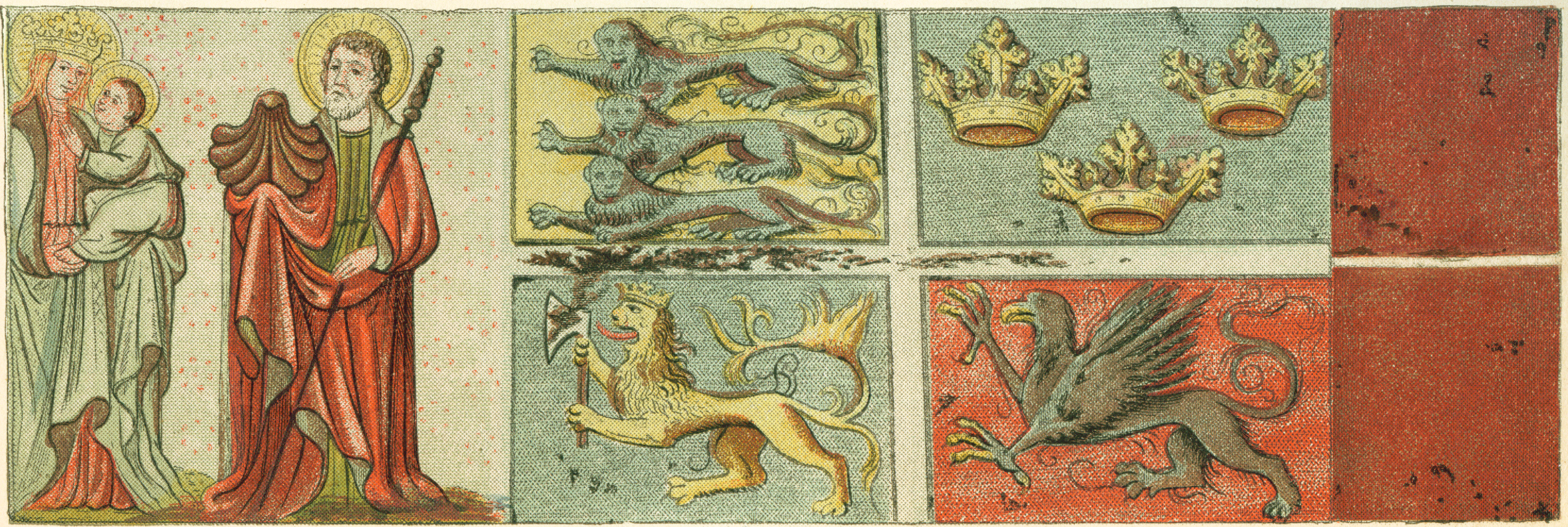
A medieval ship flag captured from a Danish ship by Lübeck forces in 1427 showed the arms of Denmark, Sweden, Norway and Pomerania. The original flag was destroyed in World War II during an Allied bombing raid on Lübeck, but a 19th-century copy remains in Frederiksborg Palace, Denmark. The saint accompanying the Virgin Mary and infant Christ is Saint James the Greater, identified by his scallop shell emblem.

A maritime flag, also called a naval flag, is a flag designated for use on ships, boats, and other watercraft. Naval flags are considered important at sea and the rules and regulations for the flying of flags are strictly enforced. The flag flown is related to the country of registration: so much so that the word "flag" is often used symbolically as a metonym for "country of registration".

== Types of flag ==
=== Ensigns ===
The Red Ensign, as currently used by the United Kingdom's Merchant Navy

The ensign is the national identification of a ship and hoisted up in a national flag world-wide. They are required to be worn when entering and leaving harbour, when sailing through foreign waters, and when the ship is signalled to do so by a warship.

Ensigns are part of seafaring traditions of private and naval forces and have their origins in the era of sailing vessels. Flag dipping is done with the ensign. Ships usually wear their ensigns between the morning colours ceremony and sunset when moored or at anchor. Warships wear it at all times when underway, and when engaged in battle, wear the "battle ensign" or multiple ensigns.

Tradition dictated that if a ship lowered its ensign it was deemed to have surrendered. Masts were targets of gunfire, and the second and subsequent ensigns were worn in order to keep the ensign flying even after a mast hit.

=== Jacks ===
Jacks are flown on the bow and placed upon a jackstaff, and used when the vessel is in a port or dressed on special occasions, and not while being underway. The origin of the jack was on warships only. However, it became an additional flag for certain other vessels and is sometimes identical with the ensign on merchant ships, depending on the ship's origin.

Jacks in the Royal Navy must be run up when the first line is ashore when coming alongside.

=== Distinctive marks ===
The flag of the National Oceanic and Atmospheric Administration, flown by all commissioned ships of the NOAA fleet as a "distinctive mark".

On 16 January 1899, commissioned ships of the United States Coast and Geodetic Survey were authorized to wear their own flag to distinguish them from ships of the United States Navy, with which they shared a common ensign. Although they continued to wear the same ensign as U.S. Navy ships, ships of the Survey flew the Coast and Geodetic Survey flag as a "distinctive mark" until the newly created National Oceanic and Atmospheric Administration (NOAA) took over control of the Survey's ships in 1970. Since then, commissioned ships of the NOAA fleet, which also wear the same national ensign as U.S. Navy ships, have worn the flag of the National Oceanic and Atmospheric Administration as a distinctive mark.

Similarly, all ships of the United States Lighthouse Service wore the U.S. Lighthouse Service flag until the service merged into the United States Coast Guard on 1 July 1939, and ships of the United States Bureau of Fisheries wore the Bureau of Fisheries flag until the bureau was merged into the United States Fish and Wildlife Service on 30 June 1940. The Fish and Wildlife service subsequently has flown its flag as a distinctive mark on its ships.

=== Rank flags ===
Rank flag of a rear admiral of the Indian Navy.

The rank flag or distinguishing flag is the flag worn by a superior officer on their flagship or headquarters (hence the term flagship). The origins of this are from the era before radiotelegraphy and radiotelephony, when orders were given by flag signals. The flag denotes the ship which must be watched for signals designating orders. Such flags are also worn when leaders of the government (presidents, prime ministers or defense secretaries) are aboard navy ships, showing the ship to hold the headquarters of highest level of authority for the armed forces. Today, with the progress in communications, this flag indicates the obligation of the other naval vessels to pay the relevant honours (manning the rails, firing cannon salute, attention, etc.) according to nautical etiquette. In a group of naval ships all commanded by superior officers, only the commander of the group or the officer of the highest rank can wear his flag.

- In the Royal Navy, admirals fly rectangular rank flags: an admiral of the fleet flies a Union Flag, while an admiral flies the St George's Cross. The flags of vice-admirals and rear-admirals have two and one additional red balls respectively. Commodores fly a Broad Pennant which is a short swallow-tailed pennant based on the St George's Cross, with a red ball at the canton (upper quarter next to the staff).
- In the United States Navy and the navies of some other countries, admirals fly rectangular flags with stars according to rank. Line officer flags are blue with white stars, while staff officer flags are white with blue stars.
- In the United States Coast Guard, the United States Public Health Service Commissioned Corps, and the National Oceanic and Atmospheric Administration Commissioned Officer Corps, admirals fly rectangular flags with stars according to rank.
- In the Hellenic Navy (Greek Navy) admirals fly blue square flags bearing a white cross (similar to the Hellenic Navy Jack) with four six-point stars (one in each of the squares formed by the cross); vice-admirals fly the same flag but with three stars; rear admirals two stars; and commodores one star. Captains, when commanding a flotilla or squadron, fly a burgee (square swallow-tailed flag) with the colours of Hellenic Navy Jack. When a rank flag is flown the commissioning pennant is displaced downward.

=== Pennants ===
The church pennant of the Royal Navy, Royal Netherlands Navy and the Royal Australian Navy

The pennant, historically called a pennon, is a long narrow flag, conveying different meanings depending on its design and use. Examples:

- A commissioning pennant, or masthead, which a warship flies from its masthead and indicates the commission of the captain of the ship (and thus of the ship itself). In the Royal Navy, the commissioning pennant is a small St George's Cross with a long tapering plain white fly. In the United States Navy, it is red above white, with seven white stars in the blue hoist. In the National Oceanic and Atmospheric Administration fleet, it has 13 (on the largest ships) or seven (on other vessels) red triangles on a white background at the hoist with a long tapering blue fly. The commissioning pennant may be displaced by various rank flags, namely the flags or pennants of admirals or commodores, and the personal flags of heads of state and members of royal families. In former centuries, masthead pennants were of a length similar to that of the ships that wore them, but nowadays very long pennants tend only to be seen when a ship is paying off.
- A church pennant, as used by the Royal Navy, Royal Netherlands Navy and Commonwealth Navies, is a broad pennant flown on ships and at establishments (bases) during religious services, and has the George Cross and Dutch flag incorporated; chosen as a result of the Anglo-Dutch Wars of the 17th century, in which both sides paused fighting on Sundays for religious services. A similar church pennant is flown by U.S. Navy ships during services.
- A senior officer present afloat pennant using the NATO signal flag for "starboard" is green on the hoist and fly with a white field between.
- A gin pennant means that the wardroom is inviting officers from ships in company to drinks. The origins of the gin pennant are uncertain, but it seems to have been used since the 1940s and probably earlier. Originally it was a small green triangular pennant measuring approximately 18 by 9 inches (460 by 230 mm), defaced with a white wine glass; nowadays the gin pennant is the "starboard" manoeuvering signal pennant defaced with a wine or cocktail glass. Its colour, size and position when hoisted were all significant as the aim was for the pennant to be as inconspicuous as possible, thereby having fewer ships sight it and subsequently accept the invitation for drinks. The gin pennant is still in regular use by Commonwealth navies, such as the Royal Australian Navy (RAN). Within the RAN it is common practice, whilst in port, for junior officers of one ship to attempt to raise the gin pennant on the halyard of another ship, thereby forcing that ship to put on free drinks for the officers of the ship that managed to raise the pennant. If, however the junior officers are caught raising the pennant, then it is their ship that must put on free drinks within their Wardroom. Usually this practice is restricted to Commonwealth navies.
- Broad pennant

=== House flag ===
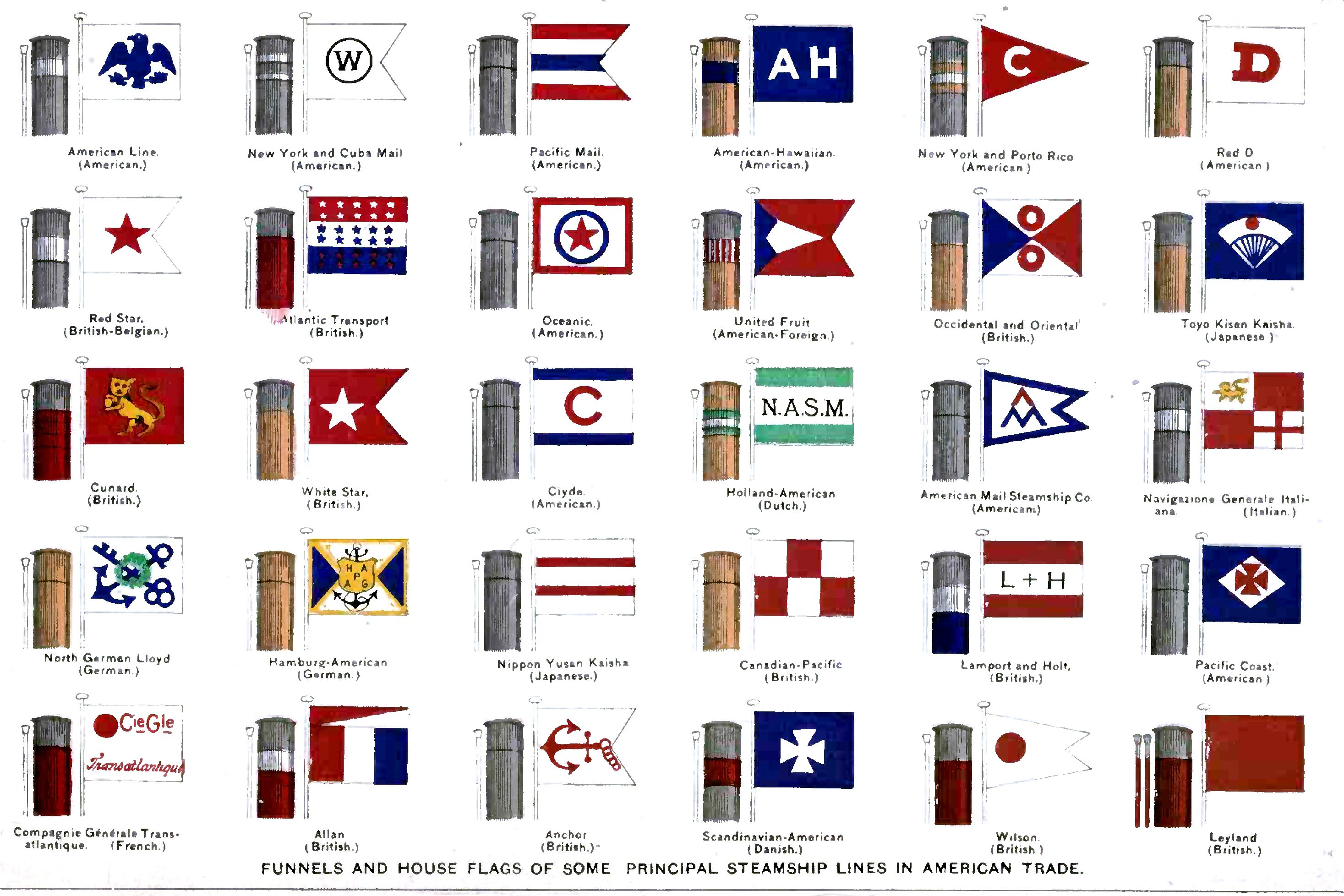
House flags, c. 1900

Merchant ships often fly a flag identifying which company owns the vessel. This was formerly flown from the mainmast but is now usually flown from the jackstaff.

=== Private signal ===
Private signals are custom designed flags used to symbolize and identify the owner of a boat.

=== Yacht club burgee ===
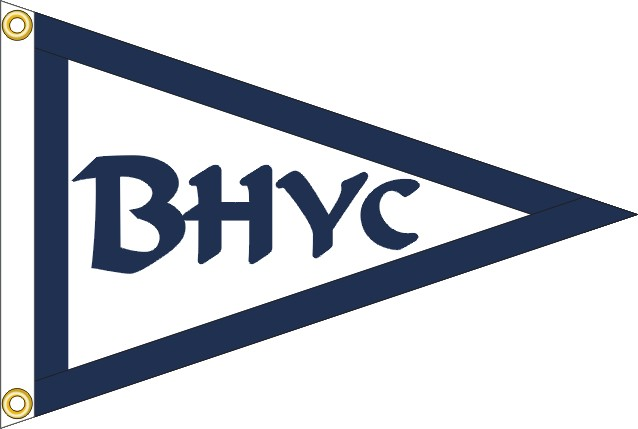
Burgee of Barrachois Harbour Yacht Club, Nova Scotia, Canada

Members belonging to a yacht club or sailing organization may fly their club's unique burgee both while underway and at anchor (however, not while racing). Sailing vessels may fly the burgee from the main masthead or from a lanyard under the starboard spreader on the mast. Power boats fly the burgee off a short staff on the bow.

=== Unit citations ===
Warships of various navies may be awarded a unit citation, for which a burgee (tapering flag with swallow-tail fly) is flown when in port.

- Ships of the United States Navy:
  - Presidential Unit Citation: yellow with blue stripe on top and red stripe at the bottom.
  - Navy Meritorious Unit Commendation: green with four yellow stripes divided by two blue and one red stripes at the centre.
  - Navy Unit Commendation: symmetrical colouring from the centre: green, red, yellow, blue.
- Ships of the Royal Australian Navy may have:
  - Unit Citation for Gallantry: burgee with narrow white band surrounding green field surmounted by a silver star.
  - Meritorious Unit Citation: design as above with yellow field.

=== Signal flags ===
There is a system of International maritime signal flags for each letter of the alphabet, and pennants for the numerals. Each flag (except the R flag) has an additional meaning when flown individually, and they take other meanings in certain combinations.

=== Courtesy flag ===
A courtesy flag (or courtesy ensign) is flown by a visiting ship in foreign waters as a token of respect. It is often a small (that is, smaller than the ship's own national ensign) national maritime flag of the host country, although there are countries (such as Malta) where the national, rather than the maritime flag is correct. The flag is customarily worn at the foremasthead of multi-masted vessels, the dockside yardarm or crosstree of the mast of single-masted vessels, while the house flag would be outboard. It may be flown from the jackstaff of vessels without masts.

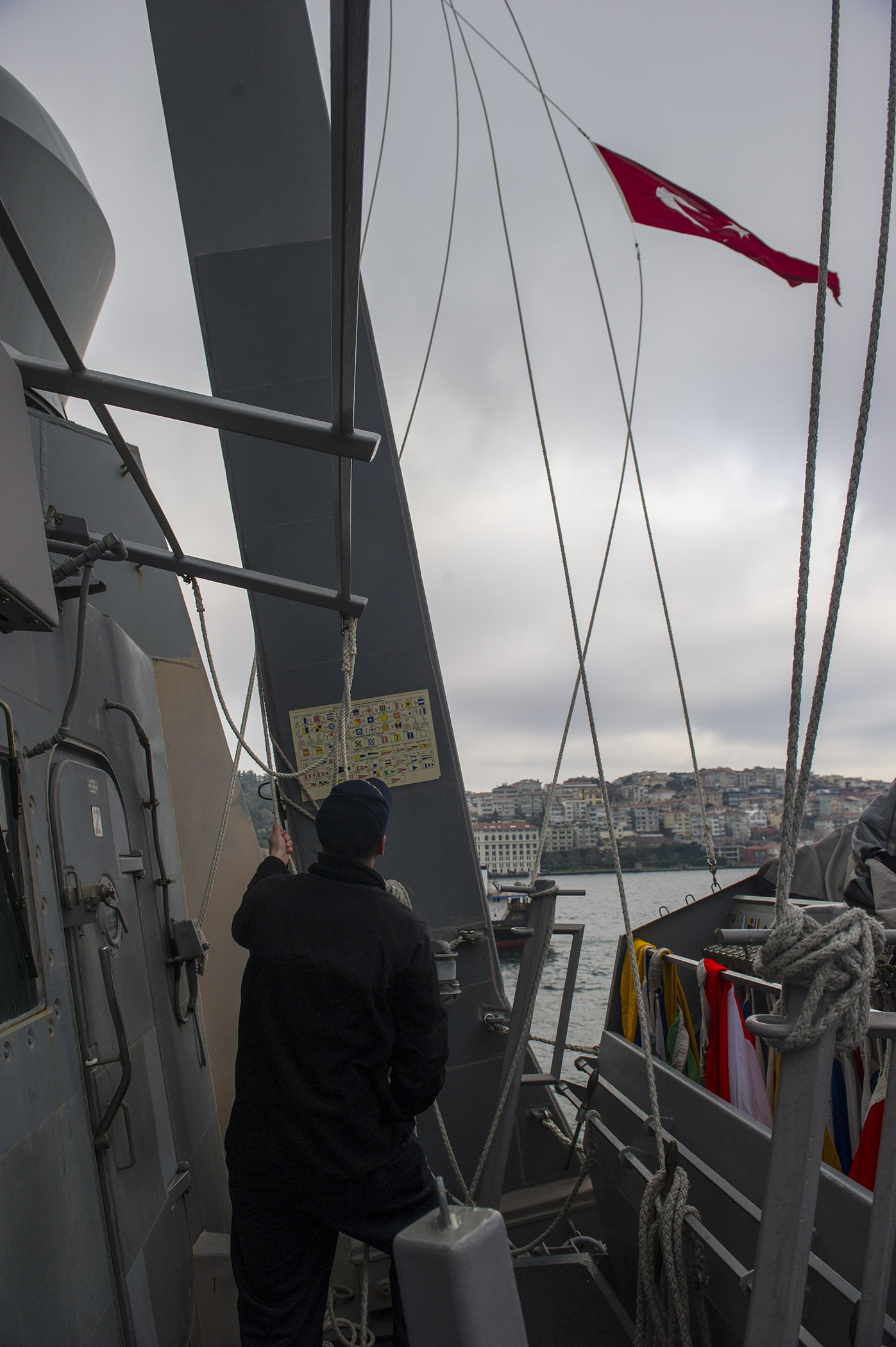
A courtesy Turkish flag is raised aboard the destroyer USS Truxtun as the ship transits the Bosphorus Strait

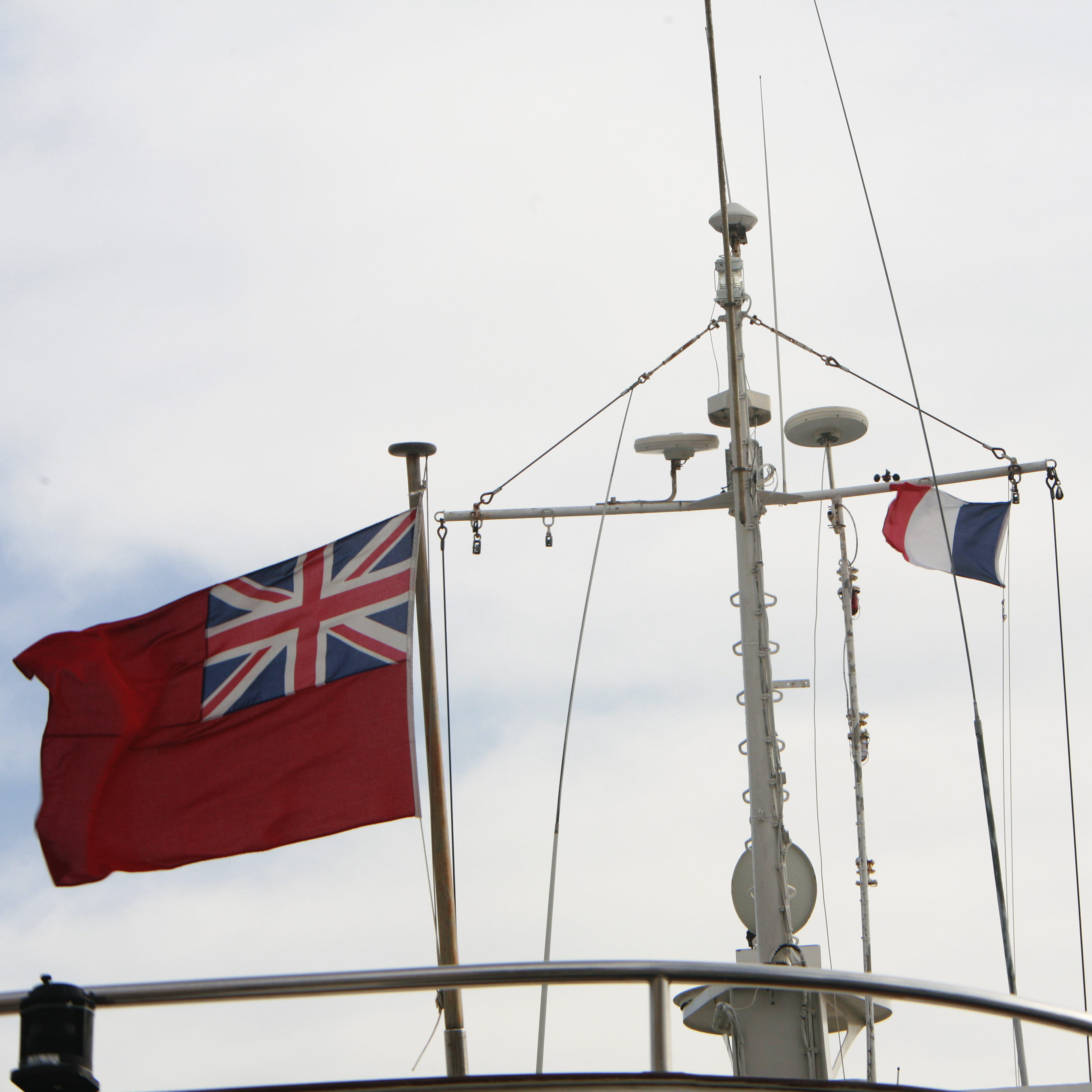
Superyacht Ariane NI in Toulon harbour, flying her British ensign and a French courtesy flag

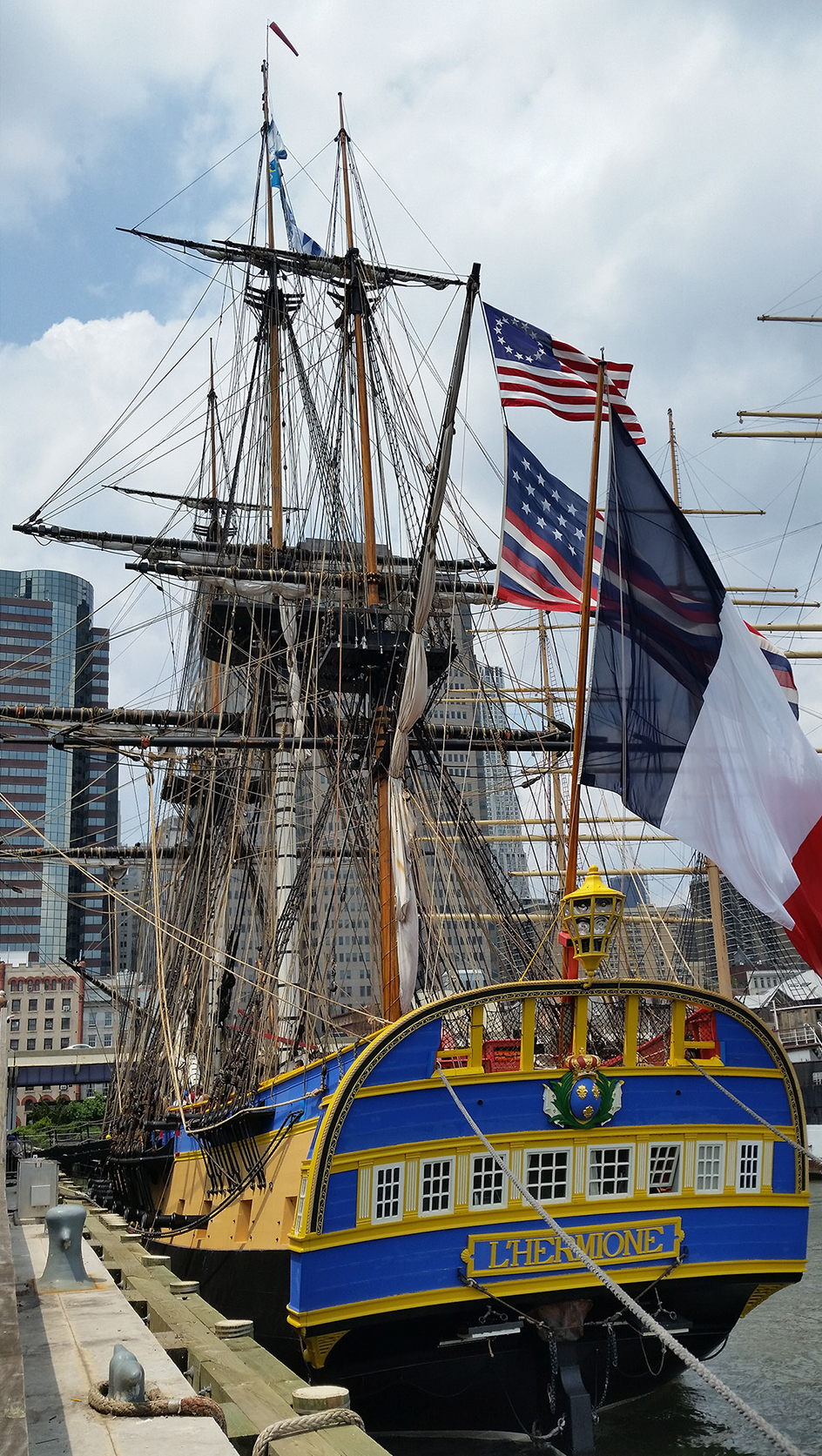
The frigate Hermione moored in New York in 2015, flying the Betsy Ross flag and the Serapis flag, two early US flags and ensigns.

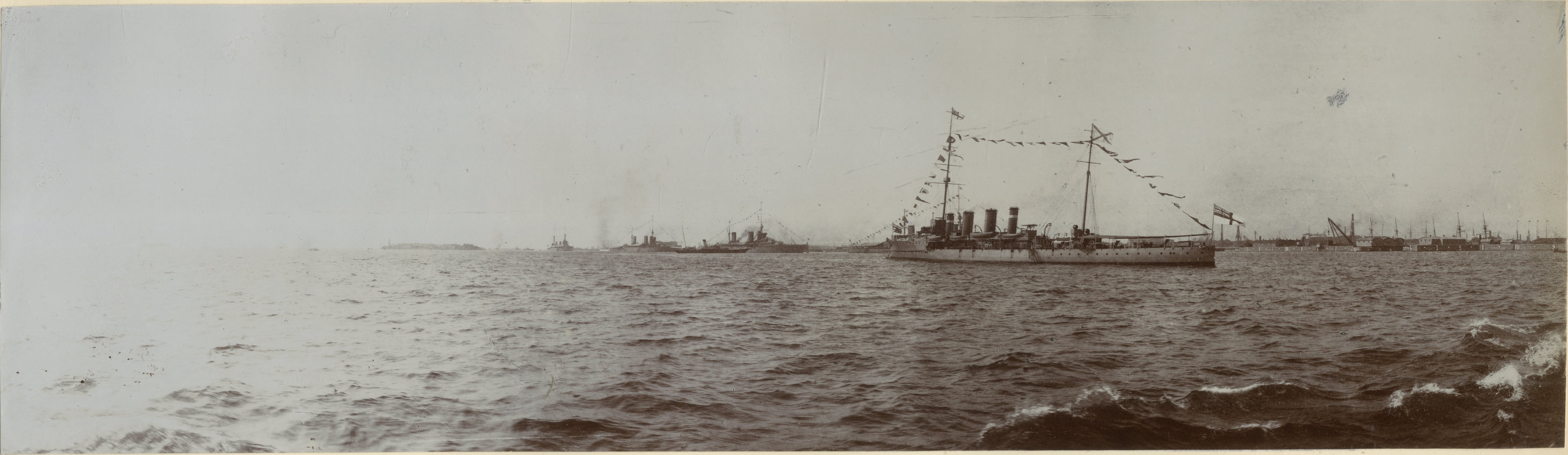
HMS Boadicea flying a courtesy Imperial Russian Navy Ensign during an official visit to Kronstadt in June 1914

== Flag etiquette ==
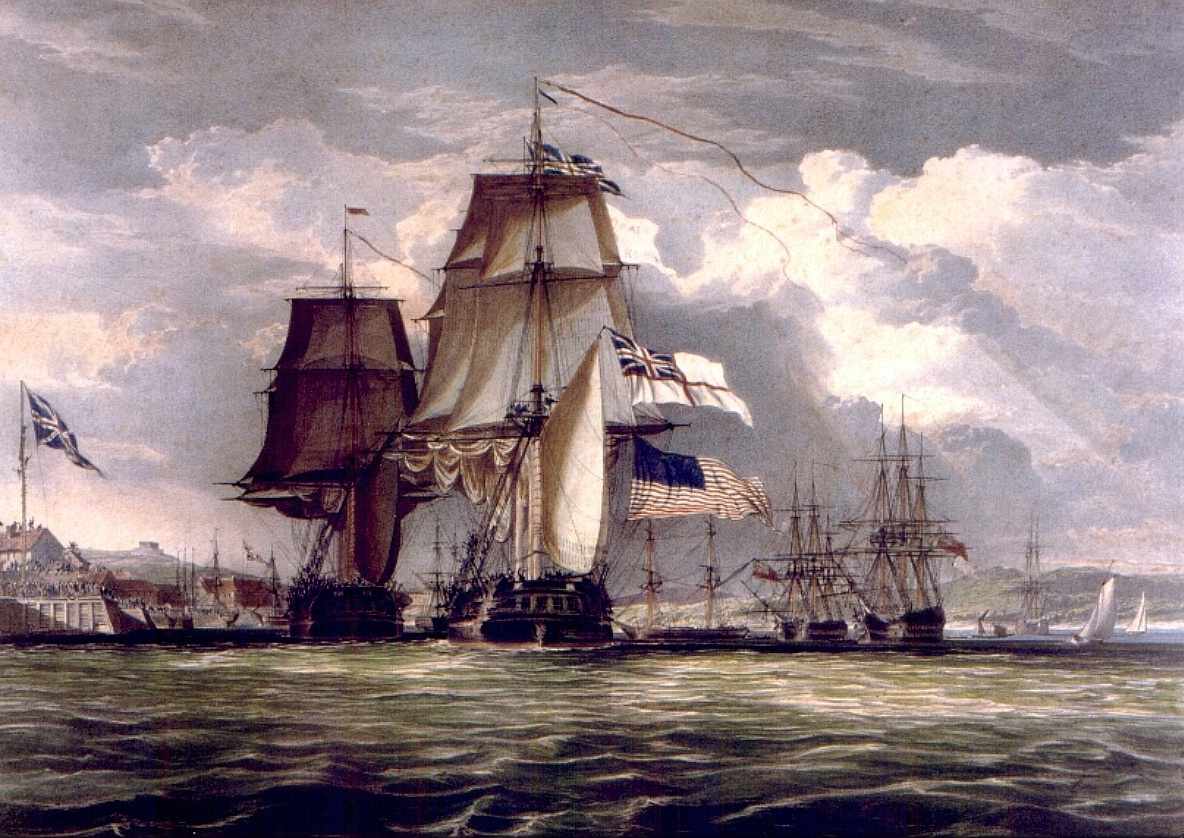
USS Chesapeake flying the Stars and Stripes below the White Ensign after her capture by HMS Shannon

The position of honour on a ship is the quarterdeck at the stern of the ship, and thus ensigns are traditionally flown either from an ensign staff at the ship's stern, or from a gaff rigged over the stern.

The rule that the highest flown flag takes precedence does not apply on board a ship: a flag flown at the stern is always in a superior position to a flag flown elsewhere on the ship, even if the latter is higher up.

The priority of hoisting locations depends on the rig of the vessel. With sloops, ketches and schooners the starboard yardarm or spreader of the highest or main mast is the second most honoured position (that is, after the ensign at the stern). Next after the starboard spreader is the port spreader. House flags (those defining the owner) are usually flown from the mainmast truck. When a club burgee is flown, it will normally be hoisted to the truck of the most forward mast. On a sloop, then, not having a foremast, the house flag could be moved to the port spreader if the starboard spreader was in use, and a burgee was being flown. On a ketch, the house flag would be moved to the mizzen.

When in port, the ensign should always be flown from the staff at the stern. This is traditional, because in former times the gaff was then lowered along with the mizzen sail. The only ensign ever flown from the starboard spreader or yardarm is that of a nation being visited. This is known as a courtesy hoisting or a courtesy flag.

At sea, it used to be that the ensign was flown from the mizzen gaff. When Bermudian sails came into general use, some skippers started to fly the ensign from two-thirds the way up the main-sail leech. Many consider this an affectation with the past. Others have taken to flying the ensign from a backstay. These are not good locations because the flag does not fly out well when hoisted raked forward.

The Canadian Heritage web page states:

whenever possible, the proper place for a vessel to display the national colours is at the stern, except that when at sea, the flag may be flown from a gaff; when in harbour the flag should be hoisted at 0800 hours and lowered at sunset.

Another recent custom has been to fly a burgee and/or a cruising or power squadron flag from the starboard spreader. This custom has arisen because many sailboats today place a racing flag or wind indicator at the masthead.

Motor boats without masts should always fly the ensign from an ensign staff at the stern. Conventionally, courtesy flags are flown from the jackstaff at the bow. This seems to some landsmen as being a reversal of priorities. However, a boat is steered by the stern and this gives it pride of place.

Nautical etiquette requires that merchant vessels dip their ensigns in salute to passing warships, which acknowledge the salute by dipping their ensigns in return. Contrary to popular belief the United States Navy does dip the Stars and Stripes in acknowledgement of salutes rendered to it. Merchant vessels traditionally fly the ensign of the nation in whose territorial waters they are sailing at the starboard yard-arm. This is known as a courtesy flag, as for yachts.

The flying of the ensigns of two countries, one above the other, on the same staff is a sign that the vessel concerned has been captured or has surrendered during wartime. The ensign flying in the inferior, or lower, position is that of the country the ship has been captured from; conversely, the ensign flying in the superior, or upper position, is that of the country that has captured the ship.

=== Dressing overall ===
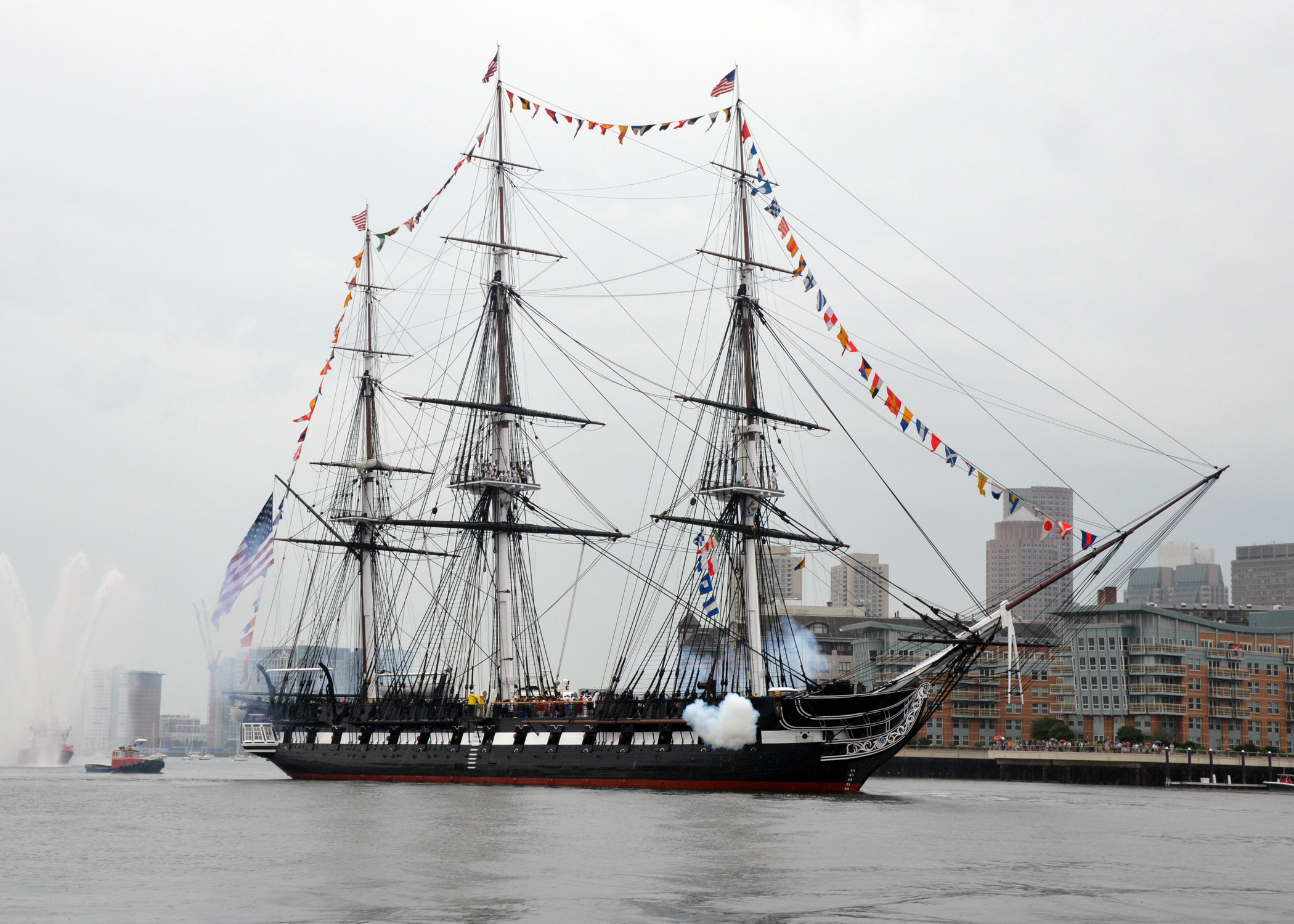
USS Constitution, dressed overall, fires a seventeen-gun salute in Boston Harbor, 4 July 2014.

As a sign of celebration, ships in harbour may be dressed overall.

== See also ==
- British ensign
- Civil ensign
- Ensign
- Flag of convenience
- Flag state
- Flag
- Glossary of vexillology
- International maritime signal flags
- Jack of the United States
- Jolly Roger
- Lists of naval flags
- Philippine coastwise emblem
- Ship registration
- Vexillology
