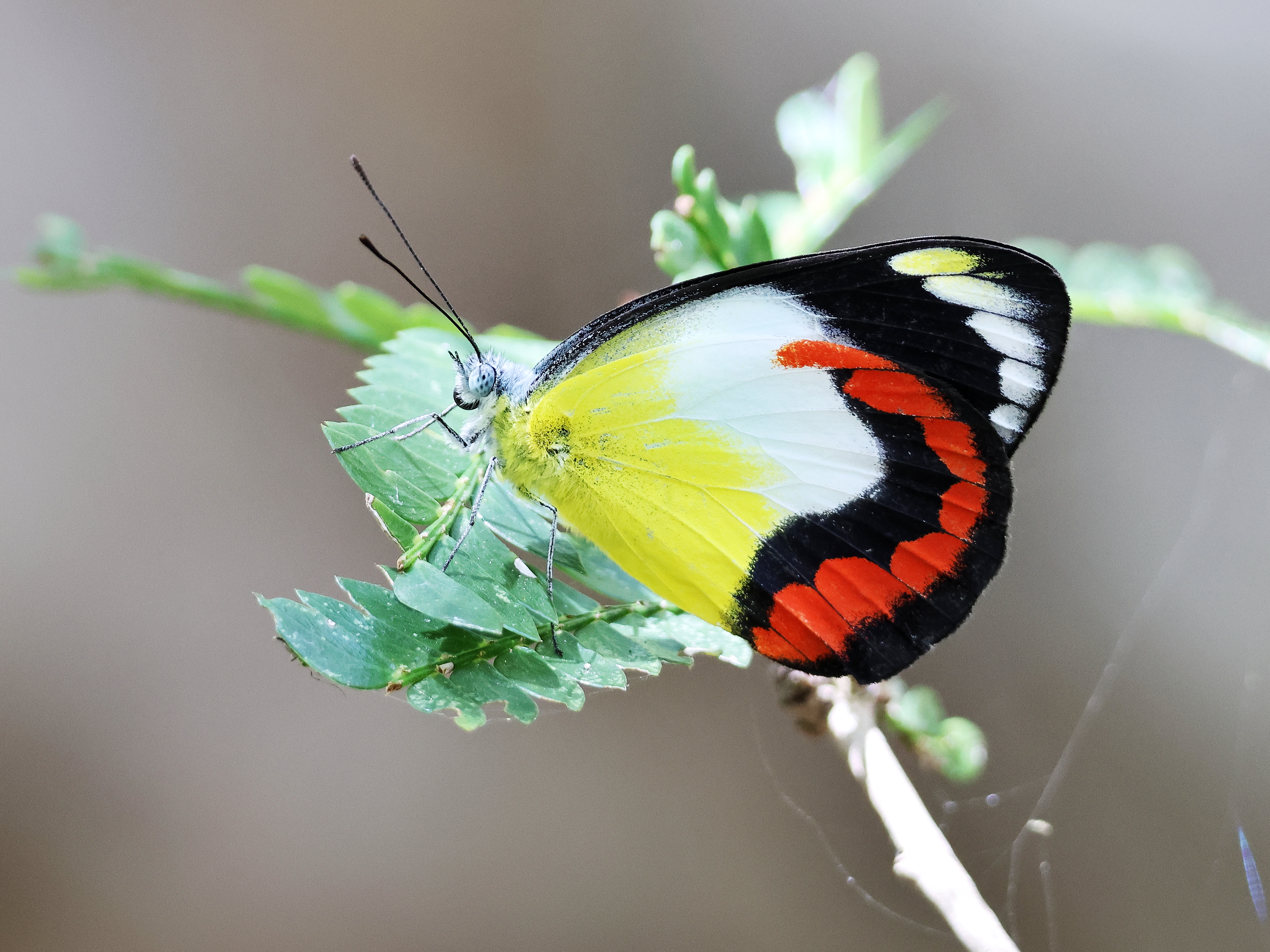

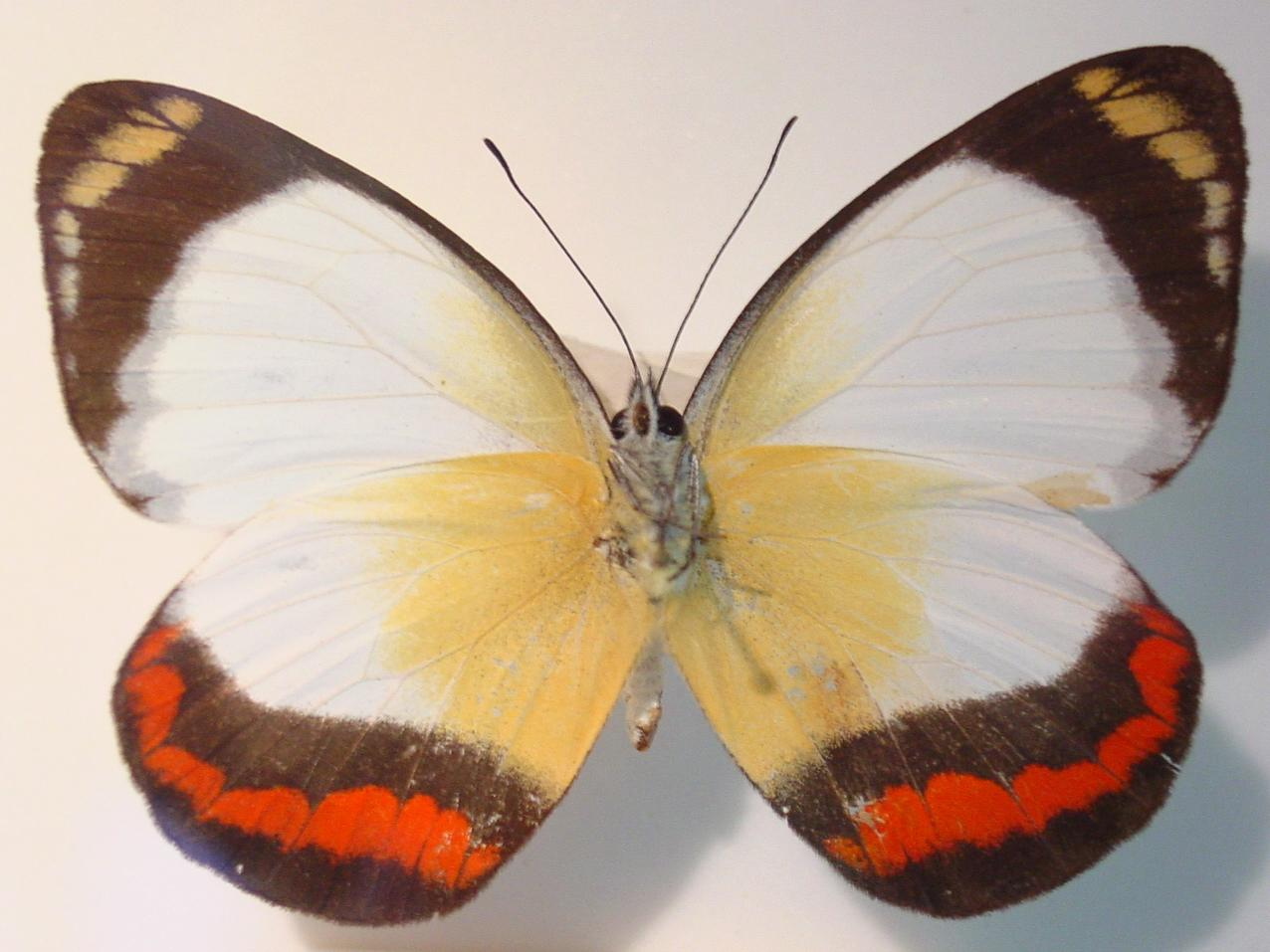

Scientific classification
- Kingdom: Animalia
- Phylum: Arthropoda
- Clade: Pancrustacea
- Class: Insecta
- Order: Lepidoptera
- Family: Pieridae
- Genus: Delias
- Species: D. mysis

Binomial name
- Delias mysis Fabricius, 1775

= Delias mysis =

Species of butterfly

Delias mysis, the Union Jack or red-banded Jezebel, is a butterfly in the family Pieridae. It is endemic to northern Australia, New Guinea and neighbouring islands. The common name is a reference to the flag of the British Empire. The butterfly was given this name, because the patterns and colours on the underside of the wings of the males resembles the flag.The species has a wide variety in colours and patterns, hence a number of subspecies have been named.

== Description ==
D. mysis appears to replace the Indian hyparete in the Papuan region and shows the same tendency as the latter to local variation. The oldest form is well known from Australia. — mysis F. (54 c) is characterised by the most extended black margining of both wings and the row of white subapical patches on the forewing. A smaller, lighter-spotted dry-season-form was named aestiva by Butler. North Australia, Queensland. — nemea subsp. nov., from Merauke, Dutch South-West New Guinea, is essentially smaller and the males have beneath a strikingly narrow red submarginal band, which bisects a very broad deep blue-black border. — onca subsp. nov. from Milne Bay (British New Guinea), forms a transition to lara Bdv., from Dutch North-West New Guinea, from which it differs in having the red and black bands on the underside of both wings almost twice as broad. intermedia Mitis, from German New Guinea, shows in the male beneath only as little proximal black bordering to the red submarginal band as oisyme. Females also occur with white, and others with yellow subapical spots on the under surface of the forewing. — oisyme subsp. nov. (54 d) is a small island race with almost quadrate forewing and very sharply defined bands and beautiful chrome-yellow subapical spots on the forewing beneath. Waigeu. - cruentata Btlr. closely approximates to oisyme, but differs from it in the much narrower red submarginal band of the hindwing. Misol. — aruensis Mitis (54 d) again approaches the mainland type, but has a longer forewing and appreciably broader spots and bands. Aru Islands. — Finally, maga Gr.-Sm. is a further well differentiated island race with the black bands on the under surface of both wings twice as broad as in my sis from the mainland, almost entirely yellow upper surface to the hindwing and broad, brilliant carmine-red submarginal band. Sudest Island, near British New Guinea.The wingspan is 60–70 mm.

== Subspecies ==
- D. m. mysis Cooktown - Queensland
- D. m. aestiva Butler, 1897Darwin area
- D. m. waterhousei Talbot, 1937Cape York - Queensland (Claudie River)
- D. m. nemea Fruhstorfer, 1910 West Irian
- D. m. aruensis Mitis, 1893 Aru
- D. m. onca Fruhstorfer, 1910 Milne Bay, Papua, Torres Straits Is.
- D. m. adelphoe Talbot Yule Island
- D. m. rosselliana Rothschild, 1915Yela, St. Aignan Island
- D. m. goodenovii Rothschild, 1915 Goodenough Island, Fergusson Island

== Biology ==
The larvae feed on mistletoe species, especially Dendrophthoe glabrescens.

== Taxonomy ==
mysis is a member of the hyparete species group.

== Gallery ==
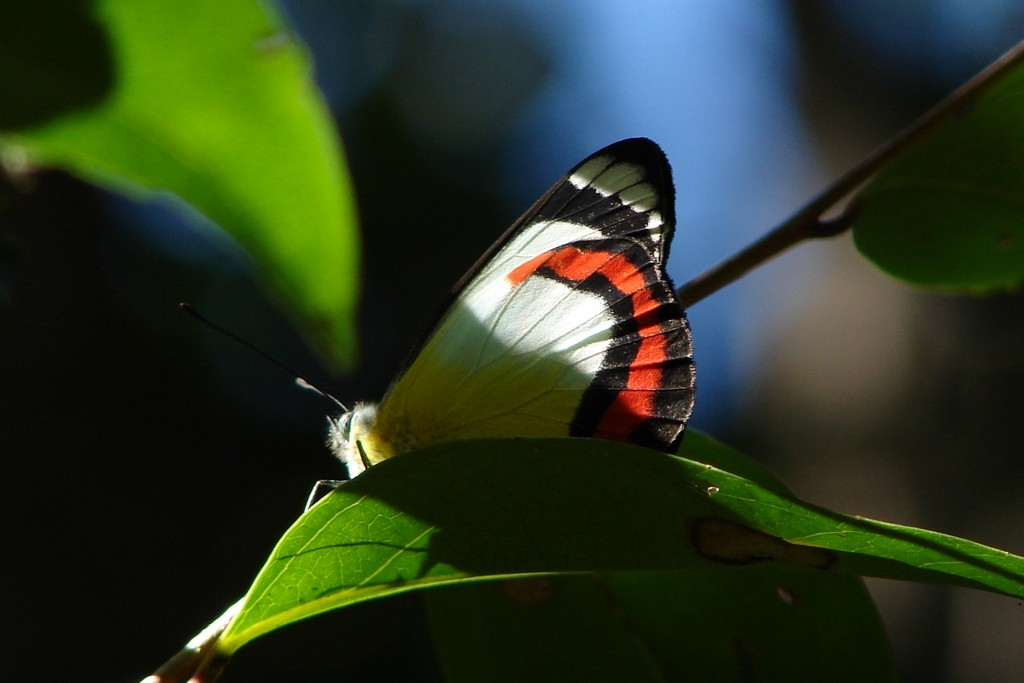
Butterfly in the rainforest of tropical Hinchinbrook island. (Australia)

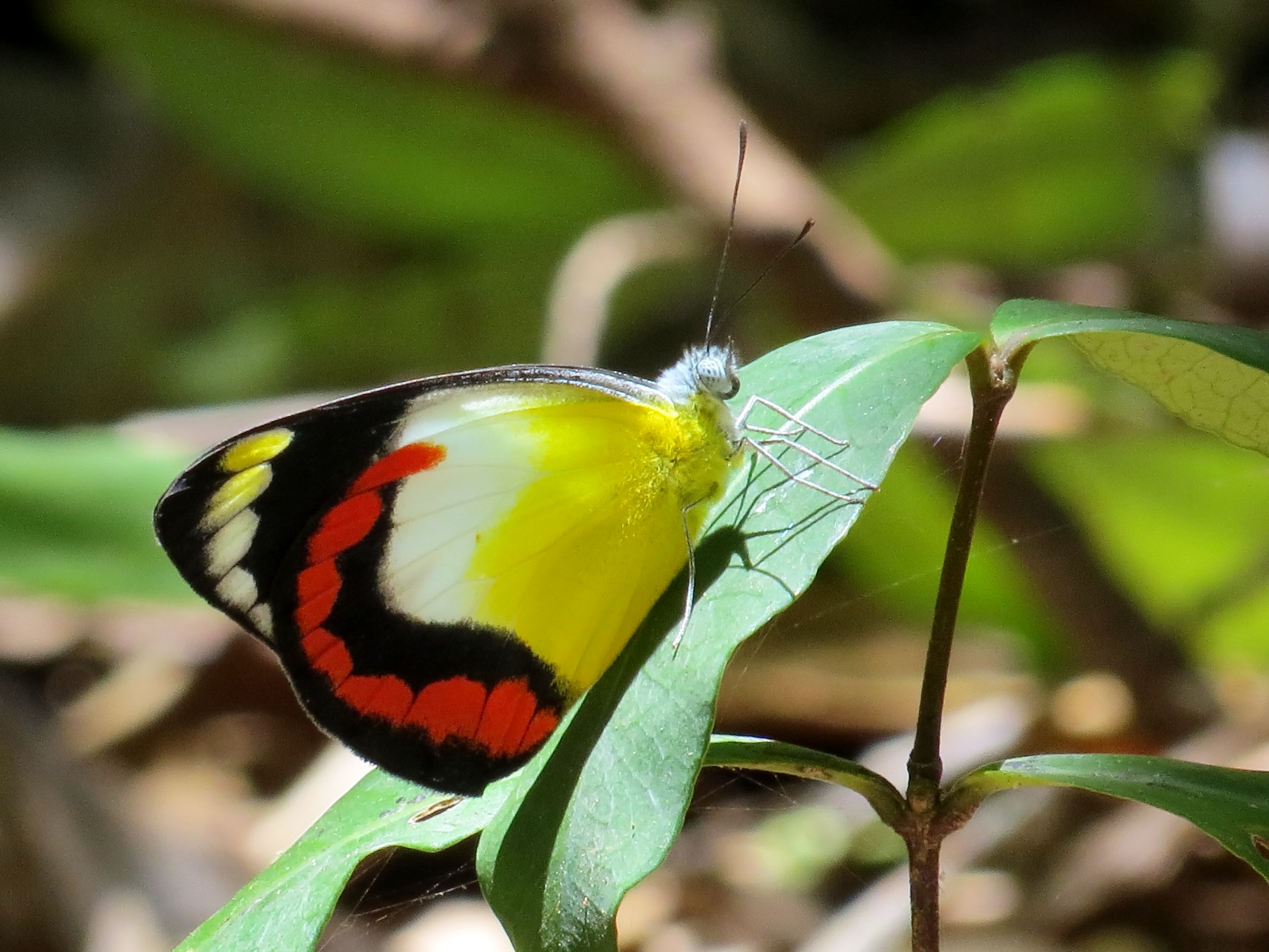
Kauri Creek, Cairns
