= French ensigns =

Flag that identifies a ship from France

A French ensign is the flag flown at sea to identify a vessel as French. Several such ensigns have existed over the years as well as terrestrial flags based on the ensign motif.

== Current ensign ==
The current French ensign is not identical to the flag of France. Though both are blue, white and red, the French civil ensign has those colours in the proportion blue 30, white 33, and red 37. The intention is to create a flag which, when seen moving at some distance, will appear to have columns of equal width; in addition, the slightly wider red column is intended to improve the flag's visibility at sea.

The current French ensign, with proportions different from those of the French flag

The lighter colored variant of the current French ensign, with proportions different from those of the French flag

Ensign used by units with historical ties to the FNFL, such as Charles De Gaulle or Aconit

== Historic ensigns ==
=== The royal Arms ===
As with the ensigns of other countries, the French ensign in the beginning of the 14th century was a banner of the royal arms, a blue field with golden fleurs-de-lys. Sometimes it bore a white cross.

In 1365, Charles V changed to a blue flag with three golden French lilies. However, reports as late as 1514 still occasionally mention the use of the lilies and cross flag.

Occasionally illustrations from this era also show the white cross, now on a red field, but this is mostly limited to the coats of arms only. After 1450, however, those two designs are often seen flying side by side.

Blue flag with white cross

Blue merchant ensign

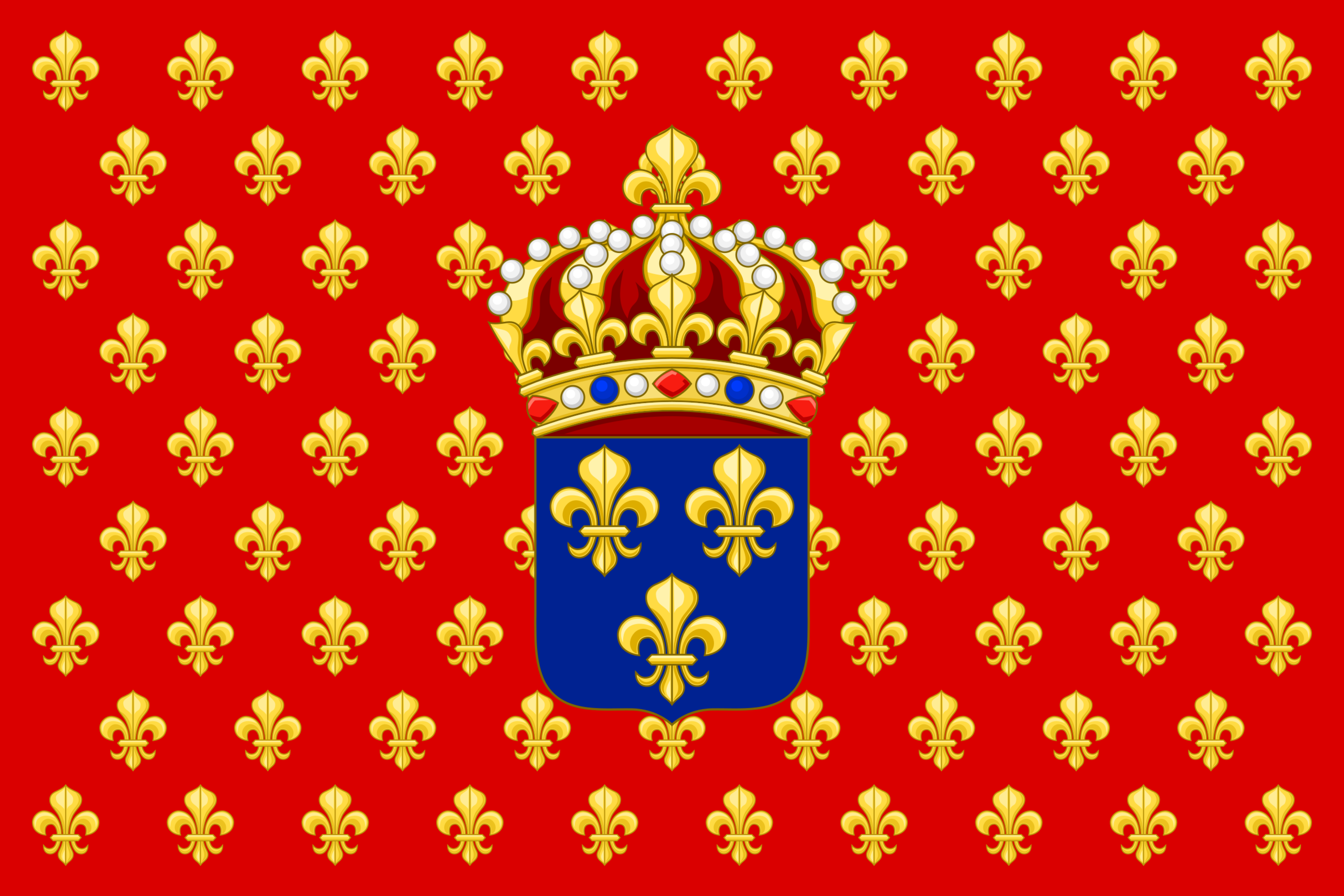
Red merchant ensign

=== The colours of Bourbon ===
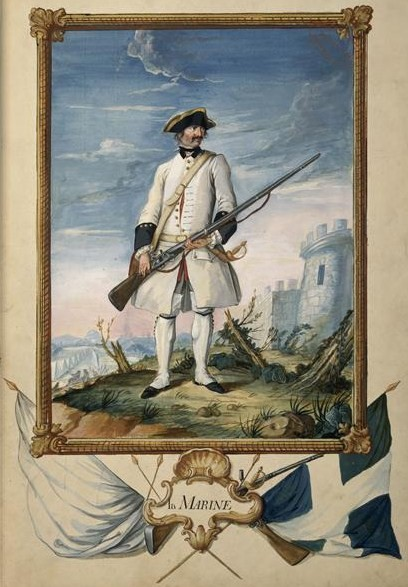
1757 illustration showing a soldier of the Marine Regiment with white flag and blue flag with white cross.

By the time of the House of Bourbon, the royal colours had merged, making blue, red, and white the royal colours; Henry IV of France even had his entire entourage dress in these colours. These colours, for these or other reasons, also became the colours of the French ensigns. A plain white ensign indicated the French sailing fleet, a red flag a galley, while the blue flag was flown by merchant ships. It's somewhat unclear whether all of these were plain flags. E.g., in 1661, the use of white flags on merchant ships was explicitly forbidden, and merchants were instead directed to fly the "old flag of the French nation", which then was supposed to be a white cross on blue, with on it the royal arms.

A decade or so later, the rule for the merchant navy was modified to allow every kind of ensign, provided it wasn't all white. This caused two new types of French ensigns: regional or local flags flown as French ensign, and personal designs intended to show as much white as was possible without it being considered all white.

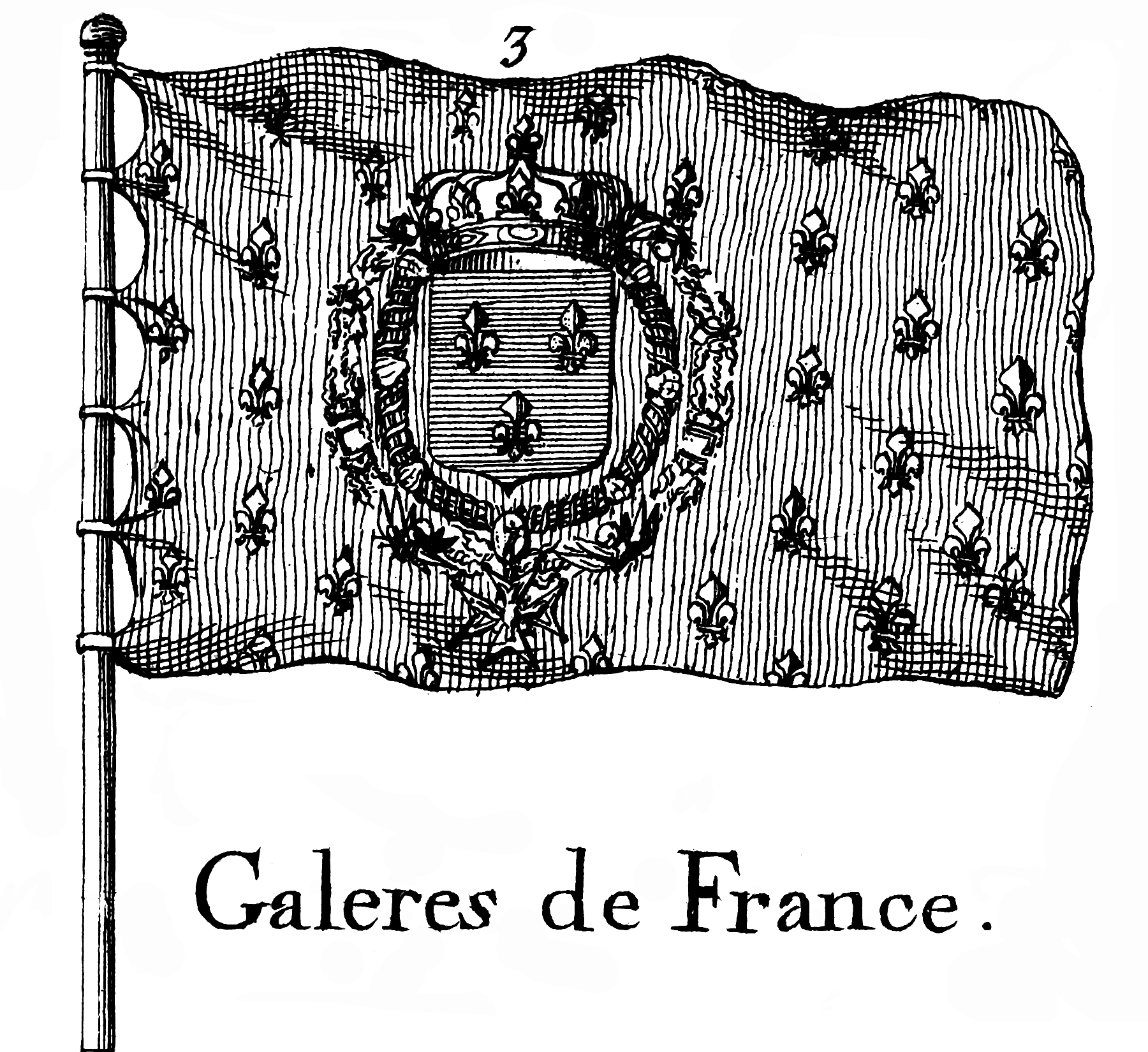
1687 illustration

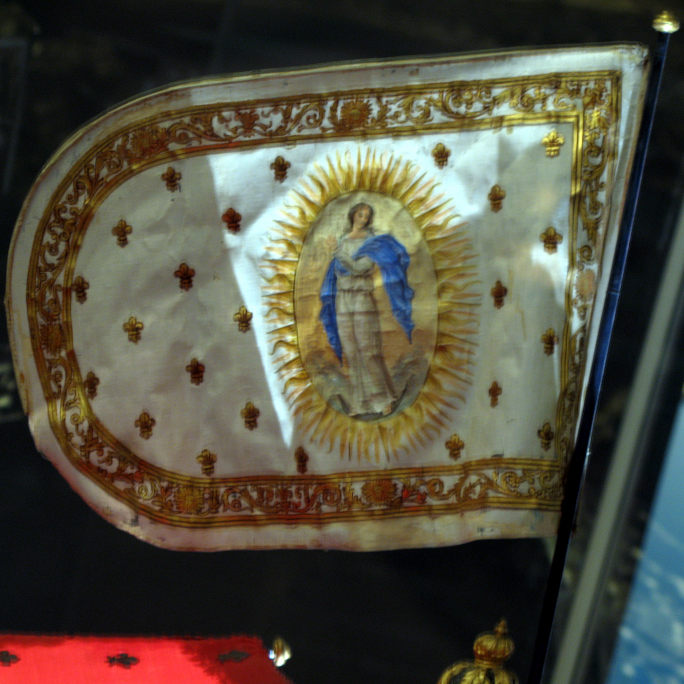
Ensign of the Réale, the prestige galley of Louis XIV.

Standard of the French royal family

Naval ensign of France prior to 1789 and between 1814/15 and 1830

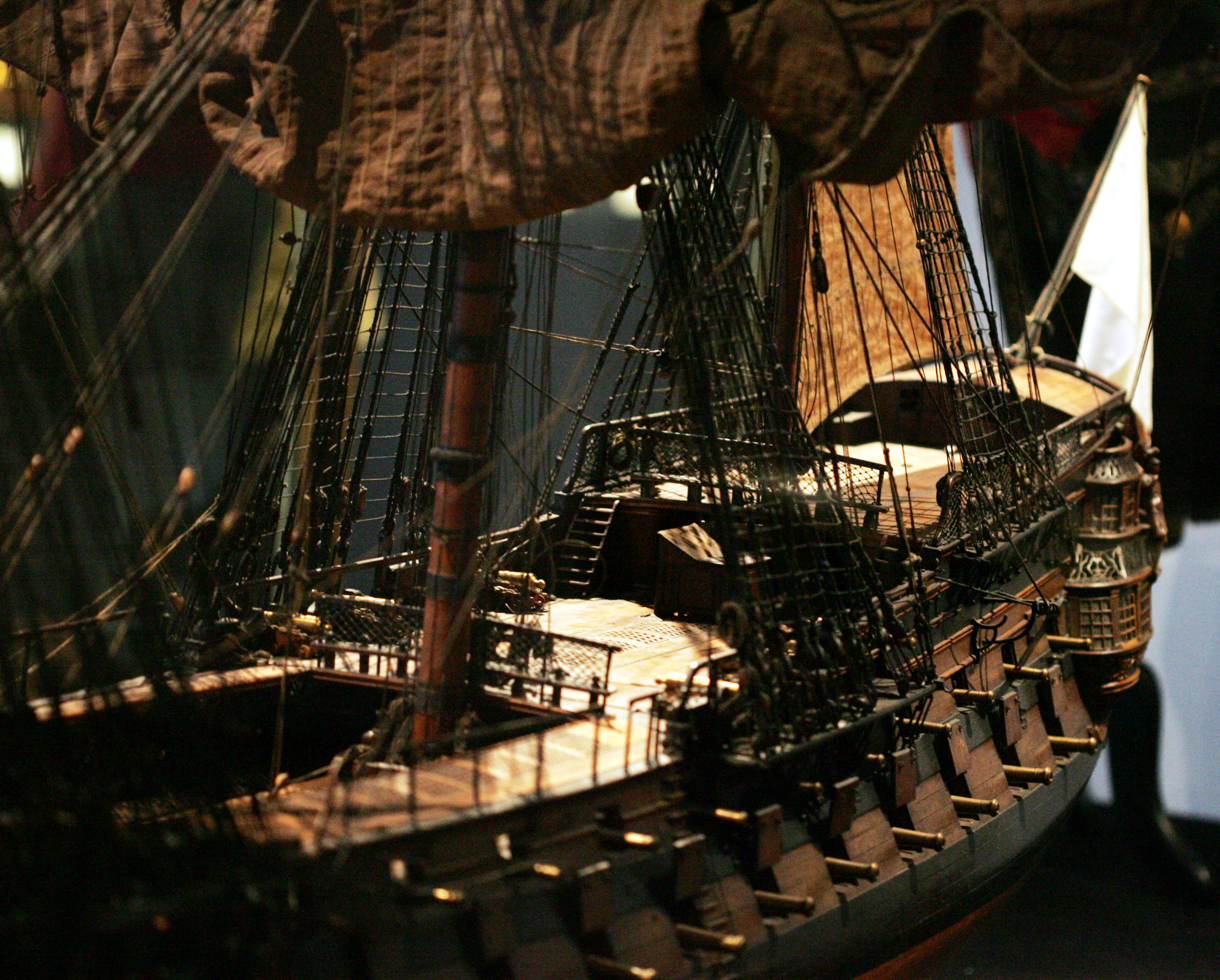
The white ensign of the Artésien

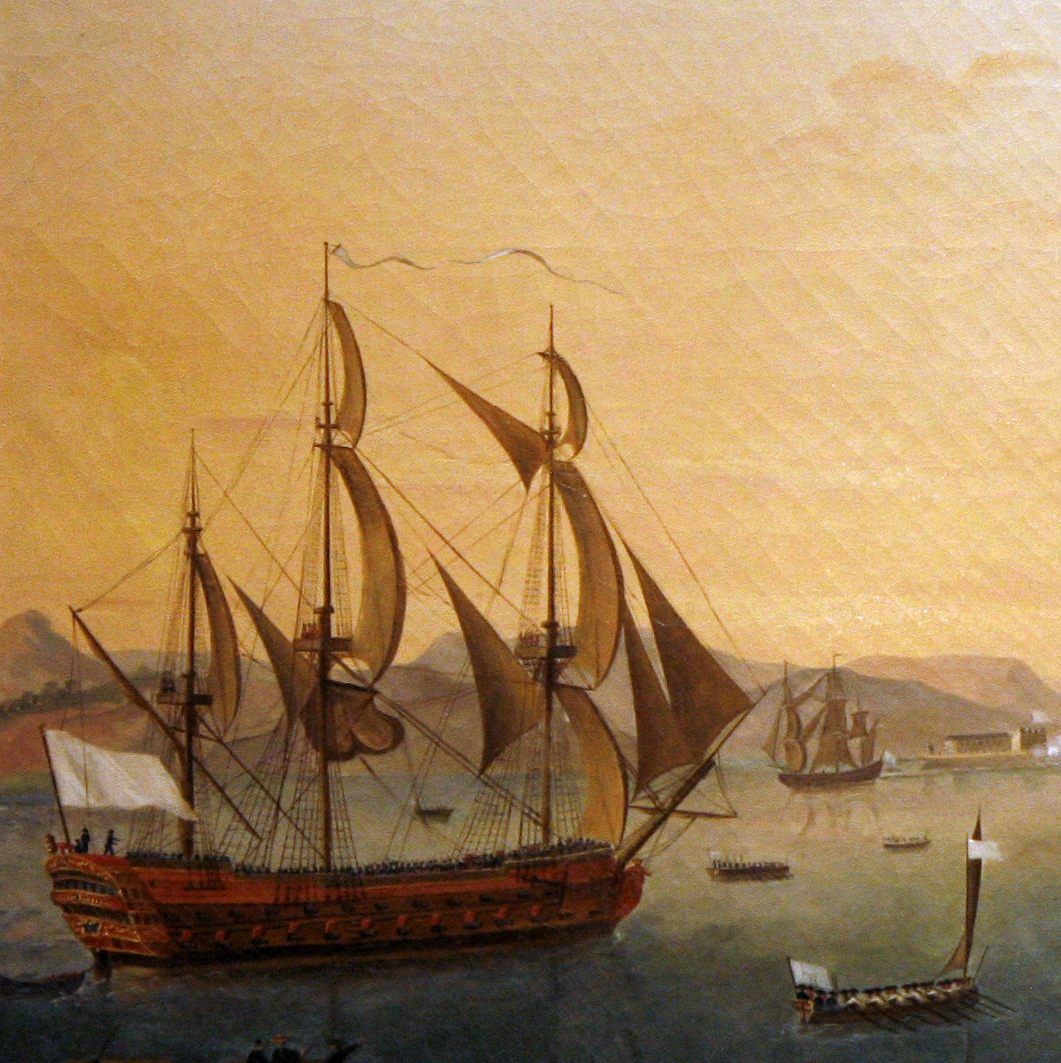
A ship of the line at the Battle of Martinique in 1780

Royal Standard of the Kingdom of France

=== The colours of the Revolution ===
Until the French Revolution, most merchants flew designs composed of blue and white. In 1790, however, the revolution joined all three colours in one flag, and the new ensign became the white flag with a canton of three equal columns of red, white, and blue. Since the white field was too royal for the taste of the revolution, on 27 pluviôse year II of the French Republican calendar (15 February 1794), the flag and the ensign were changed to the design of the current flag of France: three columns of equal width, of blue, white, and red. The same banner was again decreed to be the flag on 7 March 1848.

To counter the effect that the fly of an ensign appears to shorten when moving in the wind, the widths of the columns were regulated anew on 17 May 1853, now as 30:33:37.

1790 to 15 February 1794

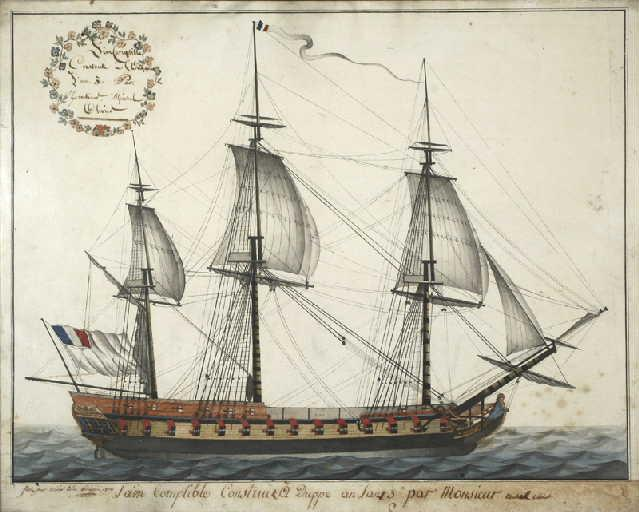
Portrait of the frigate Incorruptible flying the white flag with a tricolour canton, by Olivier Colin

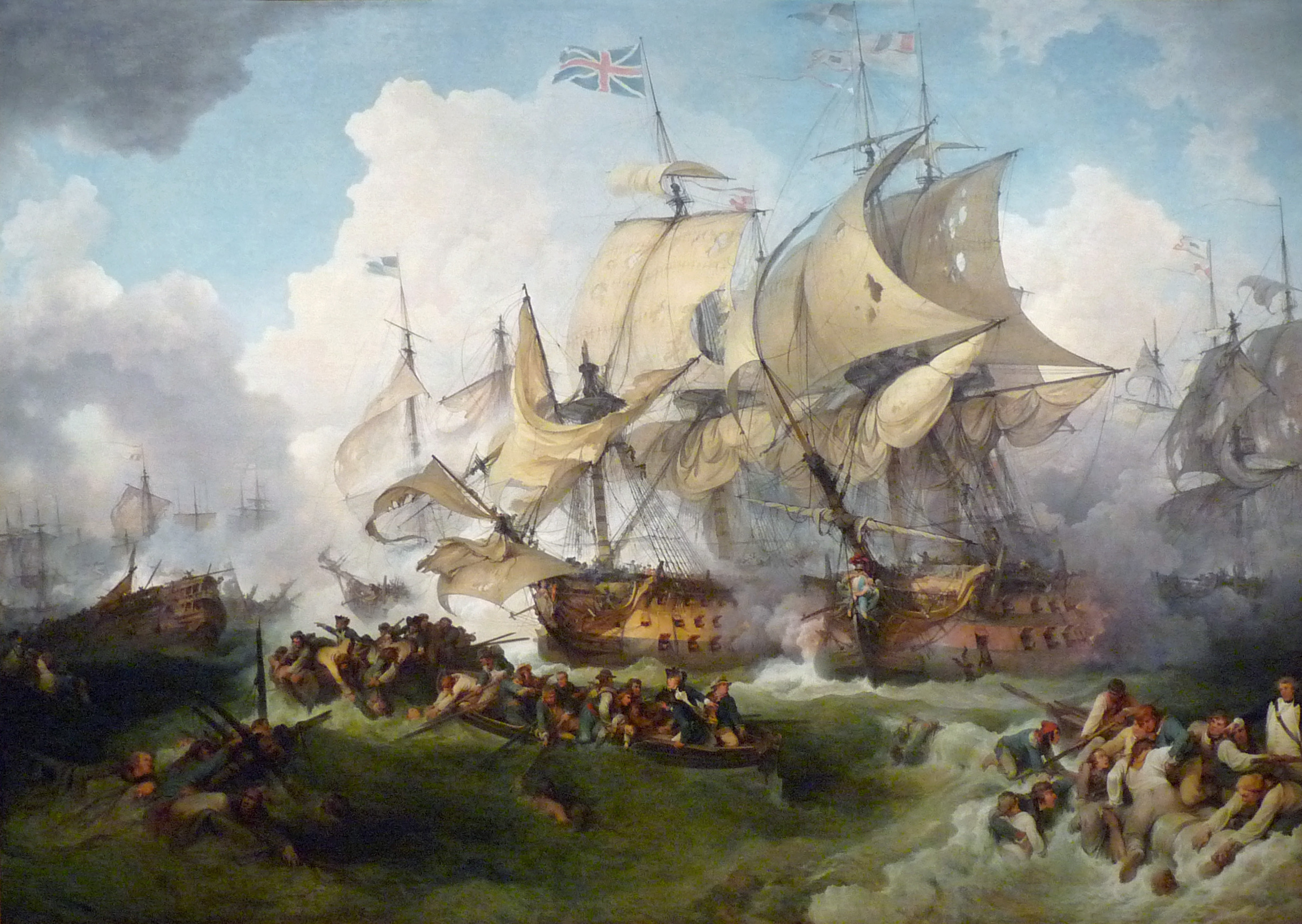
In Loutherbourg's the Glorious First of June, the Montagne flies the white flag with a tricolour canton.

1853–present (Previous ensigns had the same dimensions as the national flag.)

1958–present (Variant; previous ensigns had the same dimensions as the national flag.)

== French colonial flags ==
A number of flags used by French colonies are similar to British ensigns that were adopted by colonies throughout the British Empire except that they use the French tricolour in place of the Union Flag.

== National ensign and cocarde ==
Cockade of the Aéronautique navale

The ensign of the Marine nationale differs from the national flag by its slightly darker blue, and by the dimensions of the stripes: while the stripes of the national flag have 1:1:1 proportions, the naval ensign has 30:33:37. These differences were set in the 19th century for optical reasons.

The naval ensign is flown

- when docked: at the stern and at the bowsprit (if not replaced by the FNFL or the jack of a military award, see below)
- at sea: on the mast.

The dimensions of the ensign depend on the size of the ship, the circumstances (ceremony or regular service) and the position (aft, bowsprit or mast).

The cockade of aircraft of the French Naval Aviation (Aéronautique navale) differs from the regular cockade by bearing a black anchor.

== Bowsprit jacks and pennants ==
=== FNFL ensign ===
FNFL ensign

The FNFL ensign is flown by the ships which have fought with the Forces Navales Françaises Libres, or by ships named after such ships.

Two ships of the FNFL are still in service, the schoolship schooners Étoile and Belle Poule.

A number of modern ships bear the names of ships which have fought with the FNFL, whether because the names are traditional in the French Navy (Ouragan for instance), or specifically after a particularly significant ship (Aconit for instance). Such ships include

- the nuclear submarine Casabianca
- the stealth frigates Aconit and Surcouf
- the TCD Ouragan;

Additionally, the aircraft carrier Charles De Gaulle also flies the flag, in honour of General Charles de Gaulle, who founded the FNFL.

=== Military award jacks ===
The first column is WWI fourragère, the second is WWII and the third Overseas Wars.

Military award jacks are flown by ships which have received mention in dispatches.

- green or blue jack: colour of the Croix de Guerre (2 or 3 mentions)
- yellow jack: colour of the médaille militaire (4 or 5 mentions)
- red jack: colour of the Legion of Honour (5 mentions and more)

Each jack wear a croix de guerre, of different colors depending on the conflicts during which the mentions are won.

Crew members wear the corresponding fourragère

== Masthead pennant ==

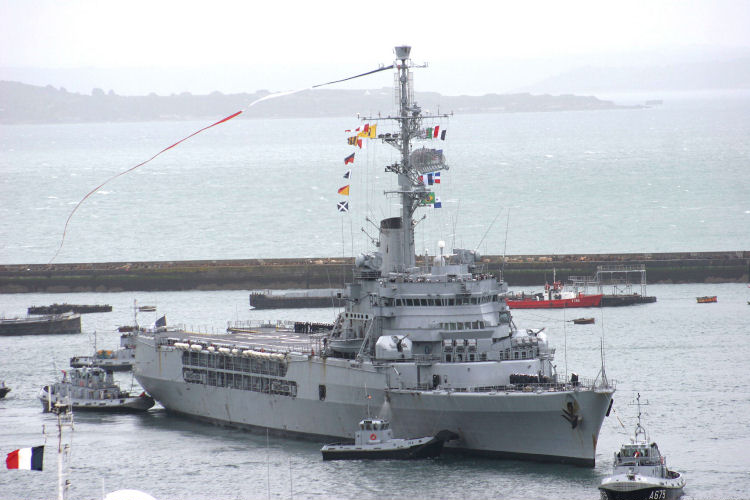
The Jeanne d'Arc flying her masthead pennant while returning to harbour

The masthead pennant, called flamme de guerre ("war pennant") indicates a Navy ship with a commissioned commanding officer. If applicable, this pennant is replaced with the jack of a high-ranking officer or a minister aboard,

There is a tradition that when a ship is on mission off France for more than 5 months, it lengthens its masthead pennant by one metre for each month spent away from the homeland. A notable occurrence is the cruiser Georges Leygues which sailed for Dakar on 9 September 1940 and fought with the FNFL, away from German-occupied France, until the Liberation; when it entered Toulon harbour on 13 September 1944, it flew a 60-metre long masthead pennant.

== Honour and command jacks ==
The following jacks are flown on the masthead if a minister, general officier or division commanding officer are aboard

Personal jack of the French President Charles de Gaulle

Jack of the Prime Minister

Jack of the Minister of Defence

Jack of the Minister of Overseas France

Jack of the Chief of the Defence Staff

Jack of the Chief of Staff of the Army

Jack of the Chief of Staff of the Navy

Jack of the Chief of Staff of the Air Force

Jack of an admiral

Jack of a Vice-amiral d'escadre

Jack of a vice-amiral

Jack of a contre-amiral

Jack of a capitaine de vaisseau commanding a division

Jack of a capitaine de vaisseau commanding a unit

Harbour commanding officer. In NATO operations, the "Starboard" is used.

Senior merchant navy officer (if no French warship is present)

== See also ==
- List of flags
- List of French flags
- Maritime flags
- French colonial flags

== Sources ==
- F.E. Hulme, The Flags of the World: Their History, Blazonry, and Associations, From the Banner of the Crusader to the Burgee of the Yachtsman; Flags National, Colonial, Personal; The Ensigns of Mighty Empires; the Symbols of Lost Causes (Colonial Edition), Frederick Wayne and Co., London, pp. 152, (1895).
- W.J. Gordon, Flags of the World Past and Present: Their Story and Associations, Frederick Wayne and Co., Ltd., London, pp. 265, (1929).
- B. McCandless, and G. Grosvenor, "Our Flag Number", The National Geographic Magazine, National Geographic Society, Washington, D.C., Vol. XXXII, No. 4, pp. 420, October, (1917).
- G. Grosvenor, and W.J. Showalter, "Flags of the World", The National Geographic Magazine, National Geographic Society, Washington, D.C., Vol. LXVI, No. 3, pp. 338–396, September, (1934).
- Flags of All Nations Volume I. National Flags and Ensigns (B.R.20(1) 1955), Her Majesty's Stationery Office, London, (1955).
- Flags of All Nations Volume II. Standards of Rulers, Sovereigns and Heads of State; Flags of Heads of Ministries, and of Naval, Military, and Air Force Officers (B.R.20(2) 1958), Her Majesty's Stationery Office, London, (1958).
- Flags of All Nations Change Five (BR20), Her Majesty's Stationery Office, London, (1989), Revision (1999).
- W. Smith, Flags Through the Ages and Across the World, McGraw-Hill Book Co., Ltd., Maidenhead, England, pp. 361, (1975).
- J.W. Norie, and J.S. Hobbs, Three Hundred and Six Illustrations of the Maritime Flags of All Nations; Arranged Geographically, with Enlarged Standards: Together with Regulations and Instructions Relating to British Flags &c., Printed for, and Published by C. Wilson, At the Navigation Warehouse and Naval Academy, No. 157, Leadenhall Street, Near Cornhill, (Facsimile reprint of 1848 original), (1987).
- Ottfried Neubecker, Flaggenbuch (Flg. B.). Bearbeitet und herausgegeben vom Oberkommando der Kriegsmarine. Abgesclossen am 1. December 1939, (Historical Facsimile edition containing all national and international flags 1939–1945), pp. 193, (1992).
