= French ship Melpomène =

Five ships of the French Navy have borne the name Melpomène, in honour of the muse Melpomene.

== Ships ==
- Melpomène (1789), a 40-gun Minerve-class frigate
- Melpomène (1812), a 44-gun Pallas-class
- Melpomène (1828), a 60-gun Surveillante-class frigate
- Melpomène (1890), a schoolship frigate
- Melpomène (1937), a torpedo boat, lead ship of her class.

== See also ==
- HMS Melpomene
