= Pennon =

Flag that is larger at the hoist than at the fly

Triangular pennant

Tapering pennant

Triangular swallowtail pennant

A pennon, also known as a pennant or pendant, is a long narrow flag which is larger at the hoist than at the fly, i.e., the flag narrows as it moves away from the flagpole. It can have several shapes, such as triangular, tapering (square tail) or triangular swallowtail (forked tail), etc. In maritime use, pennants are to be hung from the main truck.

Pennon-style flags were one of the principal three varieties of flags carried during the Middle Ages (the other two were the banner and the standard). The pennon is a flag resembling the guidon in shape, but only half the size. It does not contain any coat of arms, but only crests, mottos and heraldic and ornamental devices.

Pennoncell, streamer and wimpel are minor varieties of this style of flag (see variant types).

== Etymology ==
Pennon comes from the Latin penna, meaning "a wing" or "a feather". Initially it was a term for a "small pennant".

Pennant have been used as a general (and imprecise) term for flags which are not strictly rectangular.

Pendant is an obsolete spelling of pennant.

== Description ==
The pennon was sometimes pointed, but more generally forked or swallow-tailed at the end. In the 11th century, the pennon was generally square, the fly end being decorated with the addition of pointed tongues or streamers, somewhat similar to the oriflamme. During the reign of Henry III, the pennon acquired the distinctive swallow-tail, or the single-pointed shape. Another version of the single-pointed pennon was introduced in the 13th century. In shape this was a scalene triangle, obtained by cutting diagonally the vertically oblong banner.

== Usage ==
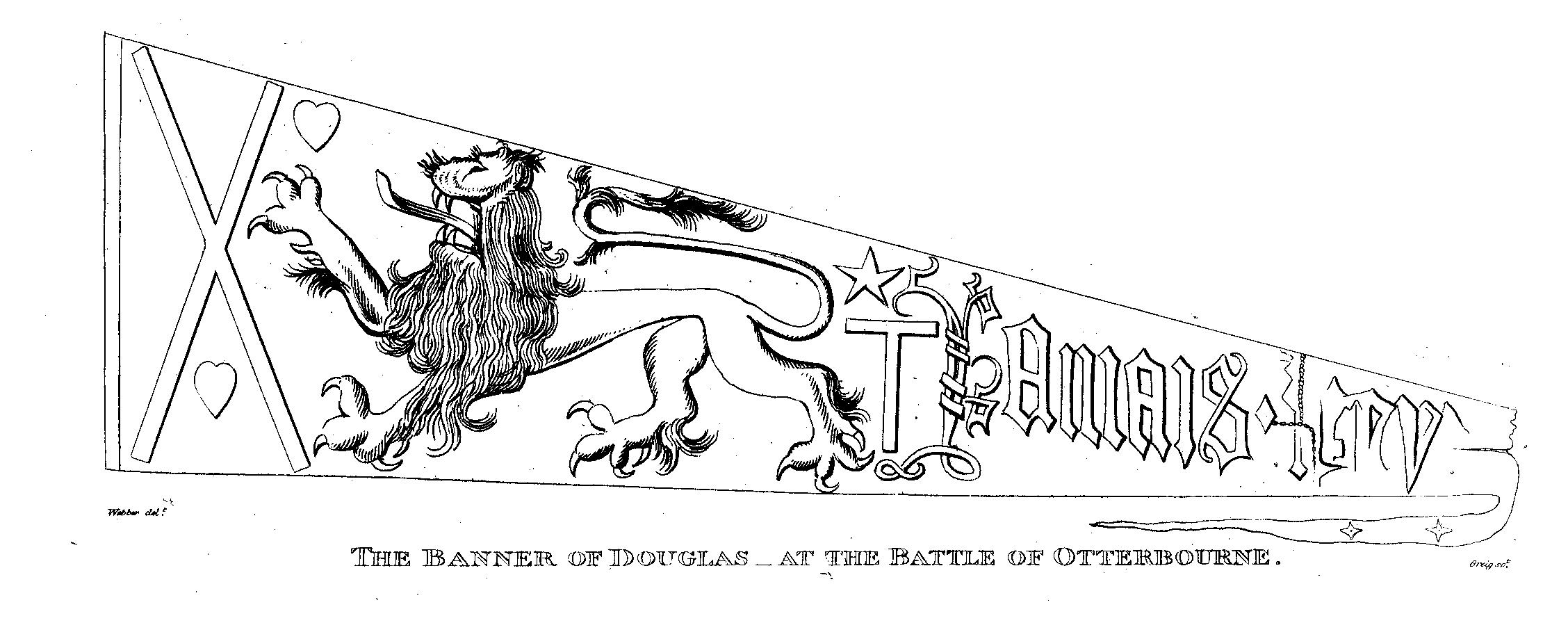
The pennon of James Douglas, Earl of Douglas as used at the Battle of Otterburn.

In modern times, the flag of Ohio is specified as a swallowtail pennant (the only non-rectangular flag of a US state).

The pennon was a purely personal ensign. It was essentially the flag of the knight bachelor, as apart from the knight banneret, carried by him on his lance, displaying his personal armorial bearings, and set out so that they stood in correct position when he couched his lance for charging. A manuscript of the 16th century (Harl. 2358, "A paper Heraldical book in small Quarto") in the British Museum, which gives detailed particulars as to the size, shape and bearings of the standards, banners, pennons and pennoncells, says "a pennon must be two yards and a half long, made round at the end, and contain the arms of the owner," and warns that "from a standard or streamer a man may flee but not from his banner or pennon bearing his arms." A pennoncell (or penselle) was a diminutive pennon carried by the esquires.

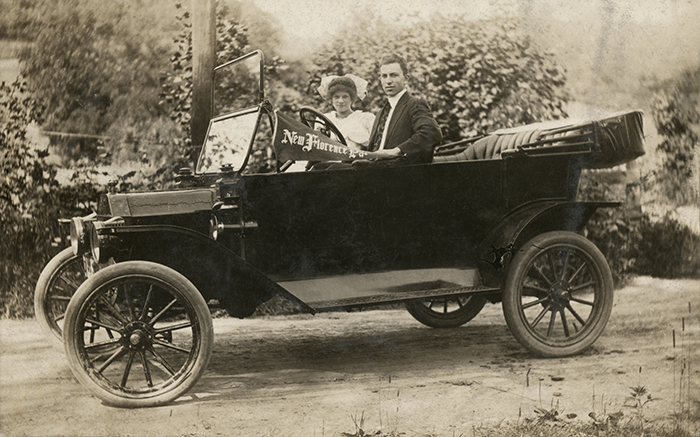
New Florence, PA pennant c.1915

Pennons were also used for any special ceremonial occasion, and more particularly at state funerals. For instance, there were "XII doz. penselles" among the items that figured at the funeral of the Duke of Norfolk in 1554, and in the description of the lord mayor's procession in 1555, it reads "two goodly pennes (state barges) decked with flags and streamers, and a 1000 penselles." Among the items that ran the total cost of the funeral of Oliver Cromwell up to an enormous sum of money, there is the mention of 30 dozen of pennoncells a foot long and costing 20 shillings a dozen, and 20 dozen of the same kind of flags at 12 shillings a dozen.

=== Sports ===
Pennons were also used in various sports.

== Variant types ==
The streamer, so called in Tudor days but now better known as the pennant or pendant, was a long, tapering flag, which it was directed "shall stand in the top of a ship or in the forecastle, and therein be put no arms, but the man's cognisance or device, and may be of length 20, 30, 40 or 60 yards (55 m), and is slit as well as a guidon or standard". Among the fittings of the ship that took Beauchamp, Earl of Warwick, to France in the reign of Henry VII was a "great streamer for the ship 40 yards (37 m) in length [and] 8 yards (7.3 m) in breadth".

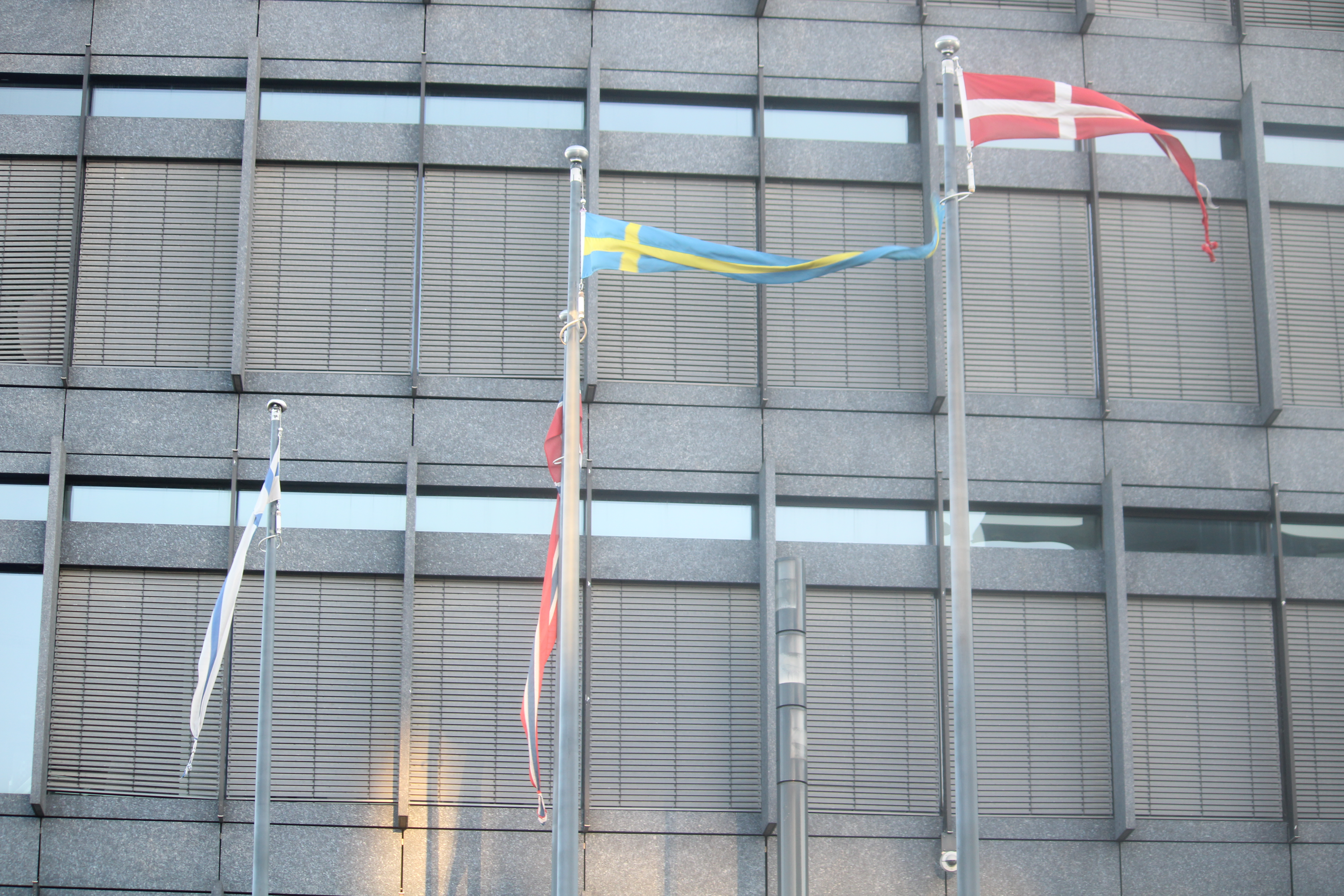
Pennons of Nordic countries in Copenhagen, Denmark

Besides the white ensign, ships commissioned in the Royal Navy fly a long streamer from the maintopgallant masthead. This, which is called a pennant, is the sign of command, and is first hoisted when a captain commissions his ship. The pennant, which was really the old "pennoncell", was of three colours for the whole of its length, and towards the end left separate in two or three tails, and so continued until the end of the Napoleonic Wars. Now, however the pennant is a long white streamer with the St George's cross in the inner portion close to the mast. Pennants have been carried by men-of-war from the earliest times, prior to 1653 at the yard-arm, but since that date at the maintopgallant masthead. There are other navies that also fly pennant in a similar manner (see commissioning pennant).

The commissioning pennant in ships may end in a point, but they can also be forked, in which case it is also called a banderole.

Pennants are also associated with American sports teams, such as Major League Baseball and college sports teams. In Australian rules football, a pennant is awarded to the winner of major competitions. For many years, this was the only prize given. As a result, a League Championship is often referred to as a "pennant", as in, "The Giants win the Pennant!" And in Australian football, a premiership can also be referred to as a "flag".

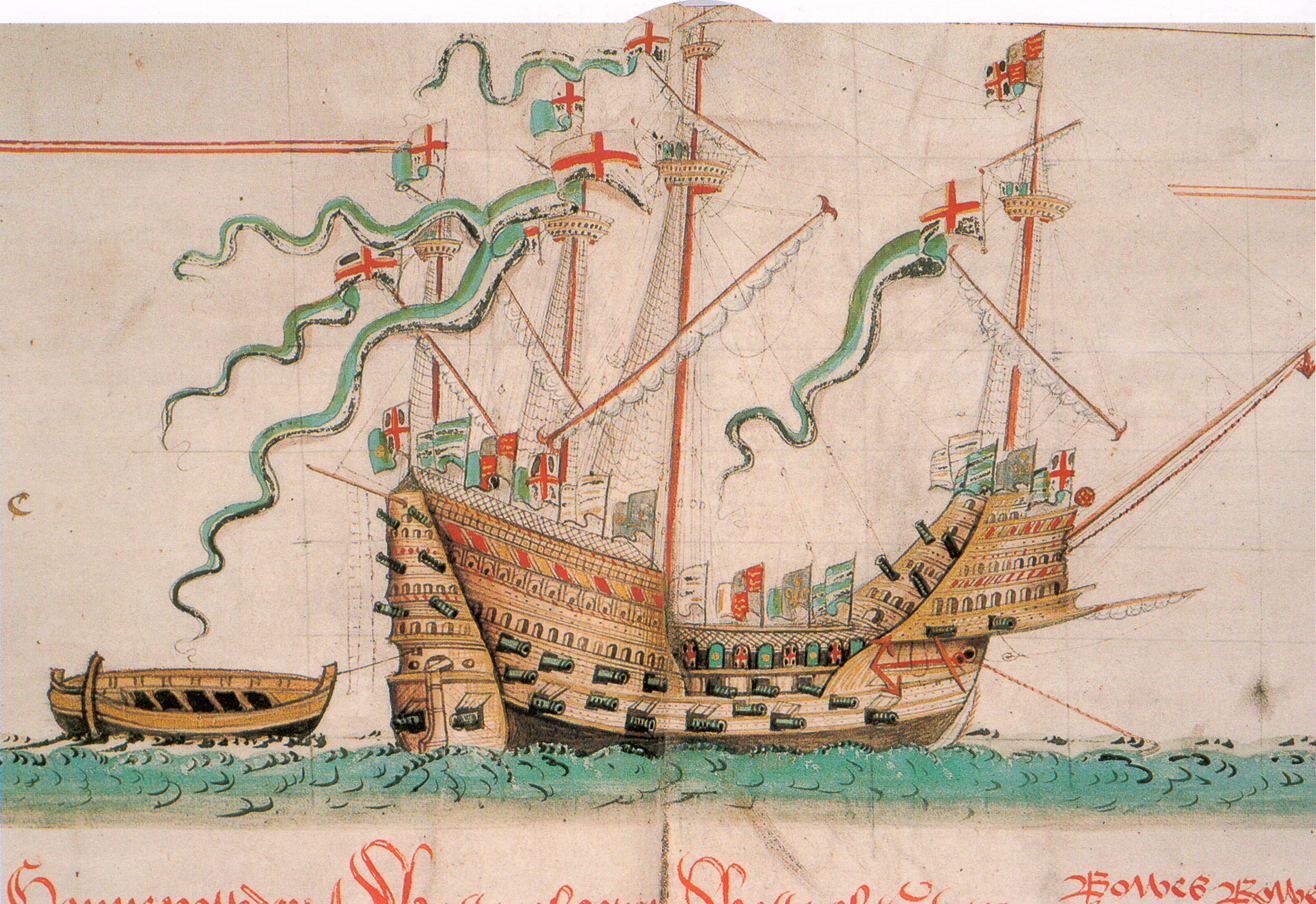
A contemporary depiction of streamers (or pennoncells) on all four masts of the warship Mary Rose which sank in 1545. Here they have a cross of Saint George at the hoist and the white and green heraldic colours of the House of Tudor along the rest of its length. Illustration from the Anthony Roll.

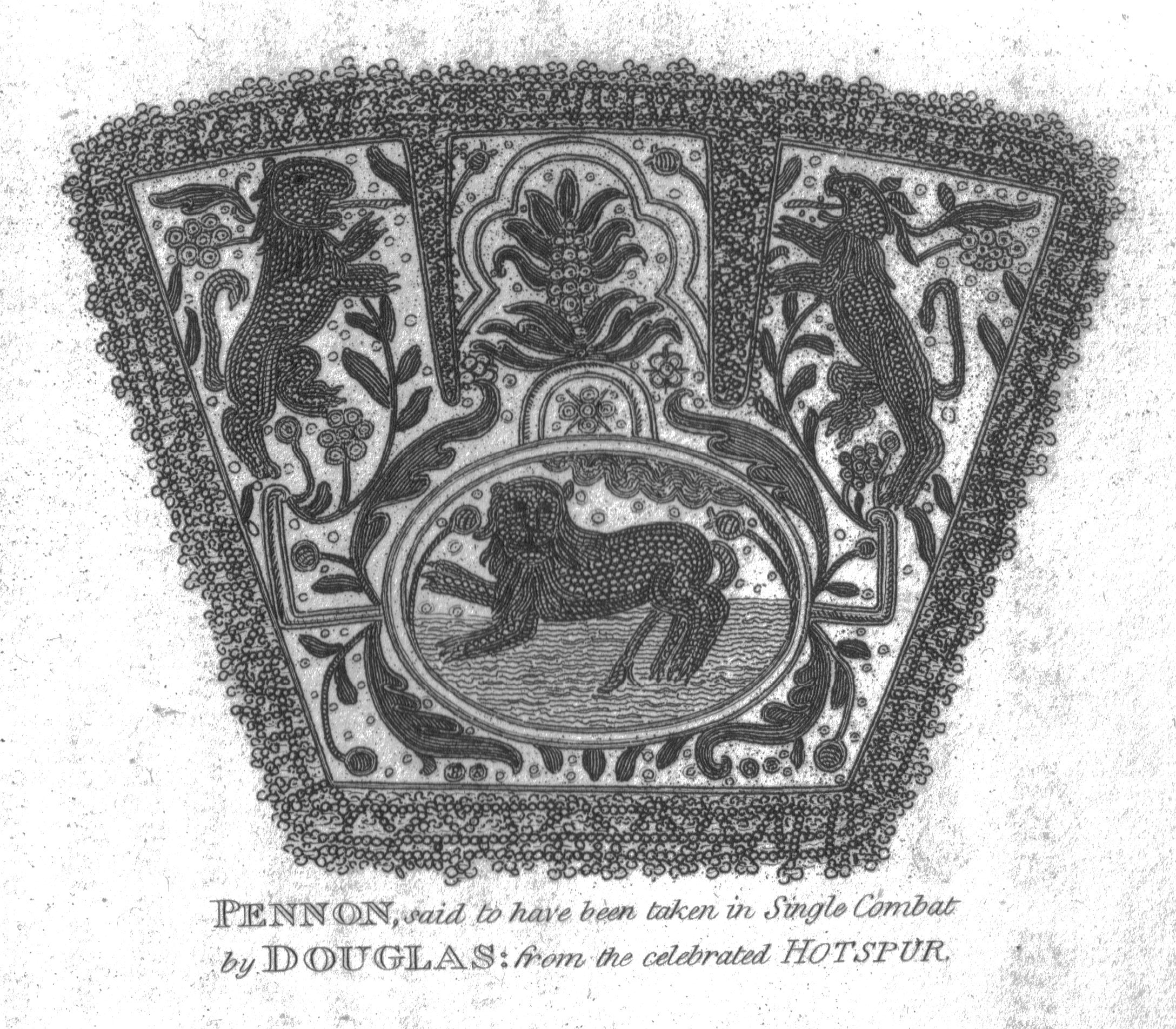
The pennon of Sir Henry Percy, also known as Harry Hotspur.

The Royal Navy's commissioning pennant.

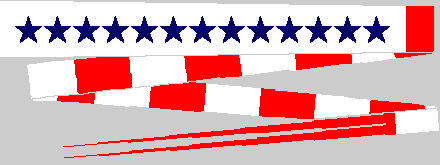
US Coast Guard's commissioning pennant.

== The Dutch pennon ==
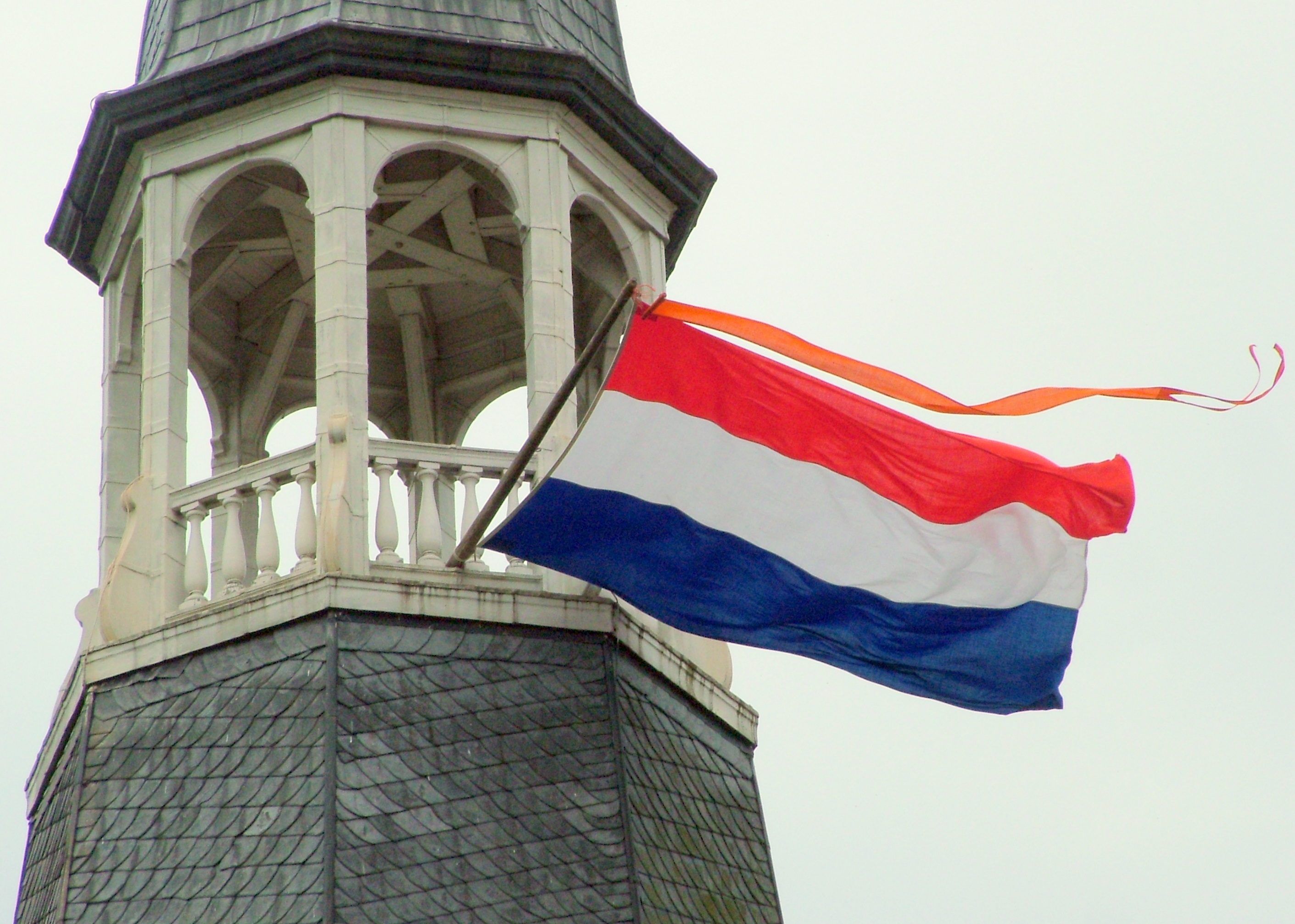
Orange pennon

In the Netherlands, an orange pennon is always used on the King's Day and several other national holidays related to the House of Orange. It is flown alongside the standard Dutch flag. The Dutch provinces each have a pennon as well.

== See also ==
- Baucans
- Burgee
- Campaign streamer
- Heraldic standard
- Household pennant
- Pennant (church)
- Pennant (commissioning)
