= Commissioning pennant =

Pennant flown from the masthead of a warship

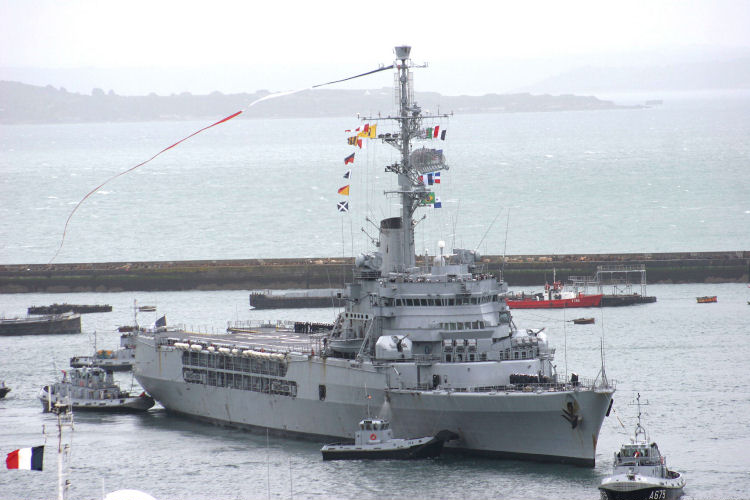
The Jeanne d'Arc flies her paying-off pennant while returning to harbour

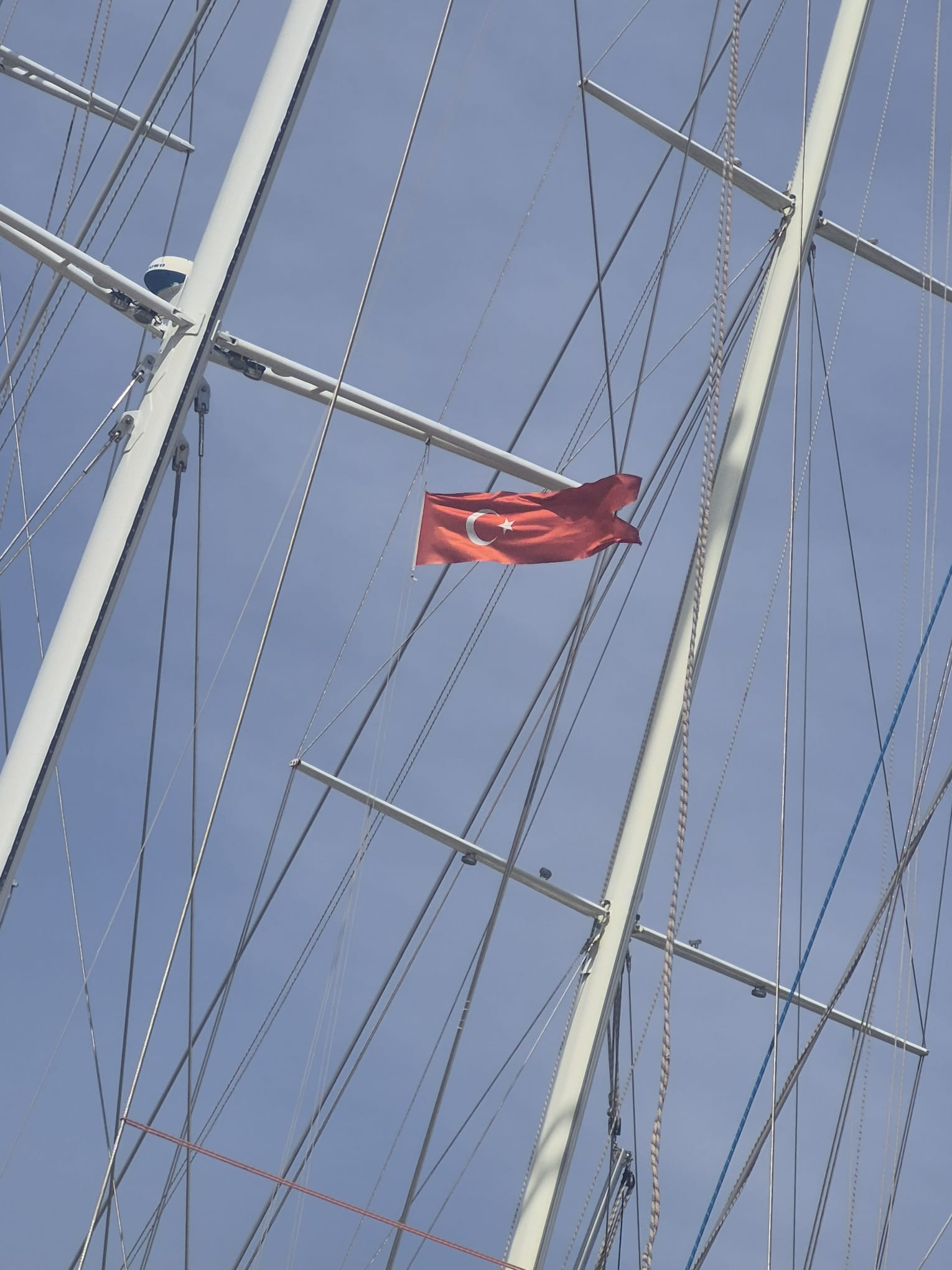
Turkish commissioning pennant

The commissioning pennant (or masthead pennant) is a pennant (also spelled "pendant") flown from the masthead of a warship. The history of flying a commissioning pennant dates back to the days of chivalry with the trail pendants of military commanders being flown from the mastheads of ships they commanded. Today, the commissioning pennants are hoisted on the day of commissioning and not struck until they are decommissioned. Some navies have a custom of flying a "paying off" or "decommissioning pennant", the length of which often reflects the length of service of the warship.

== History ==
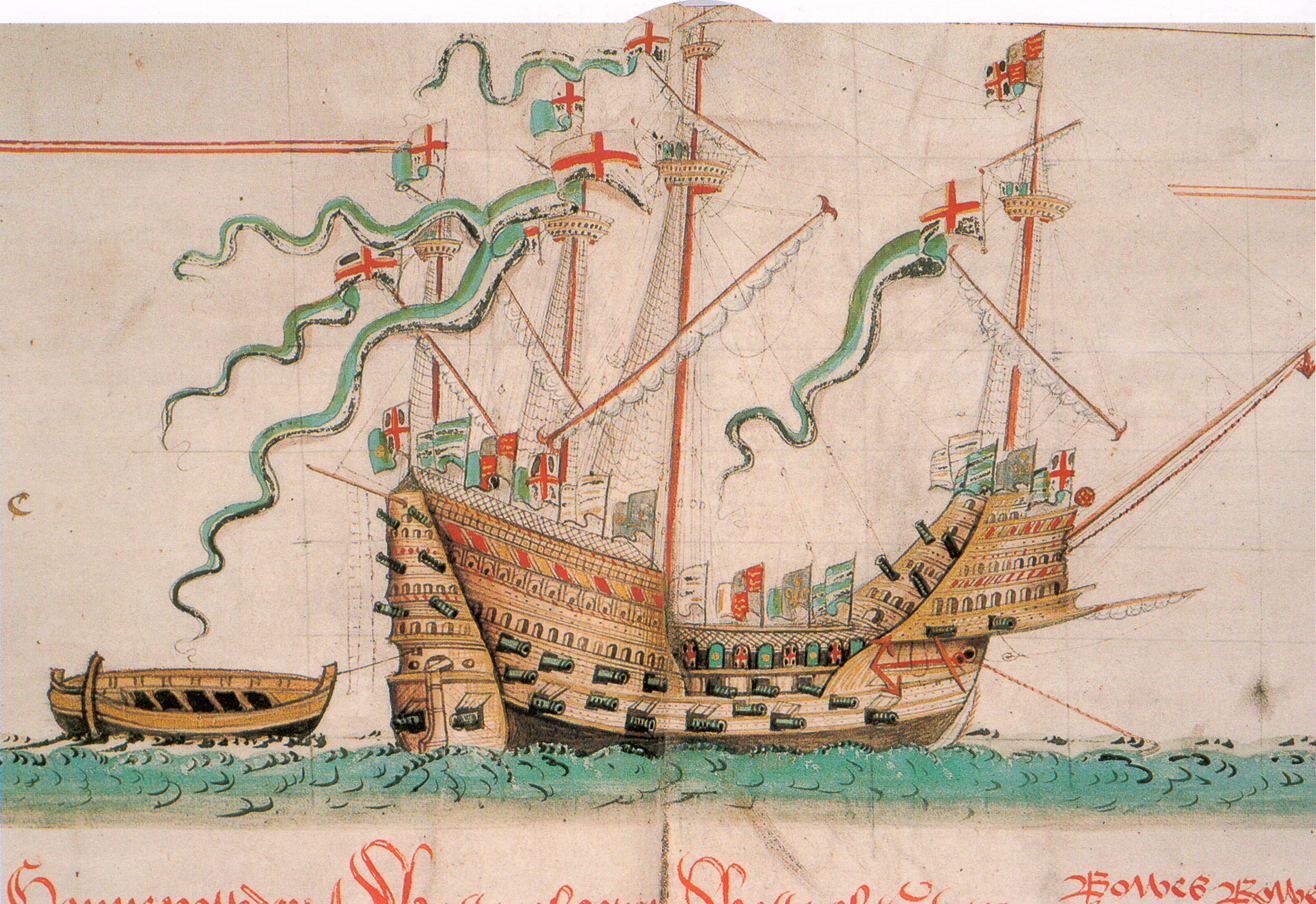
A contemporary depiction of streamers (or pennoncells) on all four masts of the warship Mary Rose which sank in 1545; here each pennant has a cross of Saint George at the hoist and the white and green heraldic colours of the House of Tudor along the rest of its length; illustration from the Anthony Roll

In the days of chivalry, knights decorated their lances with pennons. Records show that pennants were in use in the 13th century, when merchant ships were commandeered during war and placed in command of military officers, who transferred their trail pendants from their lances to the mastheads of the ships they commanded.

The practice became widespread after the First Anglo-Dutch War (1652–1654), when Dutch Admiral Maarten Tromp lashed a broom to his flagship's masthead as a sign that he had swept the English off the seas. In reply, English Admiral Robert Blake hoisted a whip to the masthead to signify that he would whip the Dutchman into subjection.

The pennant is an evolution of old "pennoncell", that in the Royal Navy used to consist of three colours for the whole of its length, and towards the end left separate in two or three tails. The tradition continued until the end of the Napoleonic Wars when the Royal Navy adopted the style of pennants used by the service today. Pennants have been carried by warships from the earliest times, prior to 1653 at the yardarm, but since then at the maintopgallant masthead.

Today the pennant is hoisted on the day a warship or establishment commissions and is never struck until the day of decommissioning. It is, however, displaced by Royal Standards and the personal or distinguishing flags or pennants of commodores and admirals. In Navy ships the pennant is flown at the masthead, for which reason it is also commonly referred to as a masthead pennant.

== Commissioning pennant ==
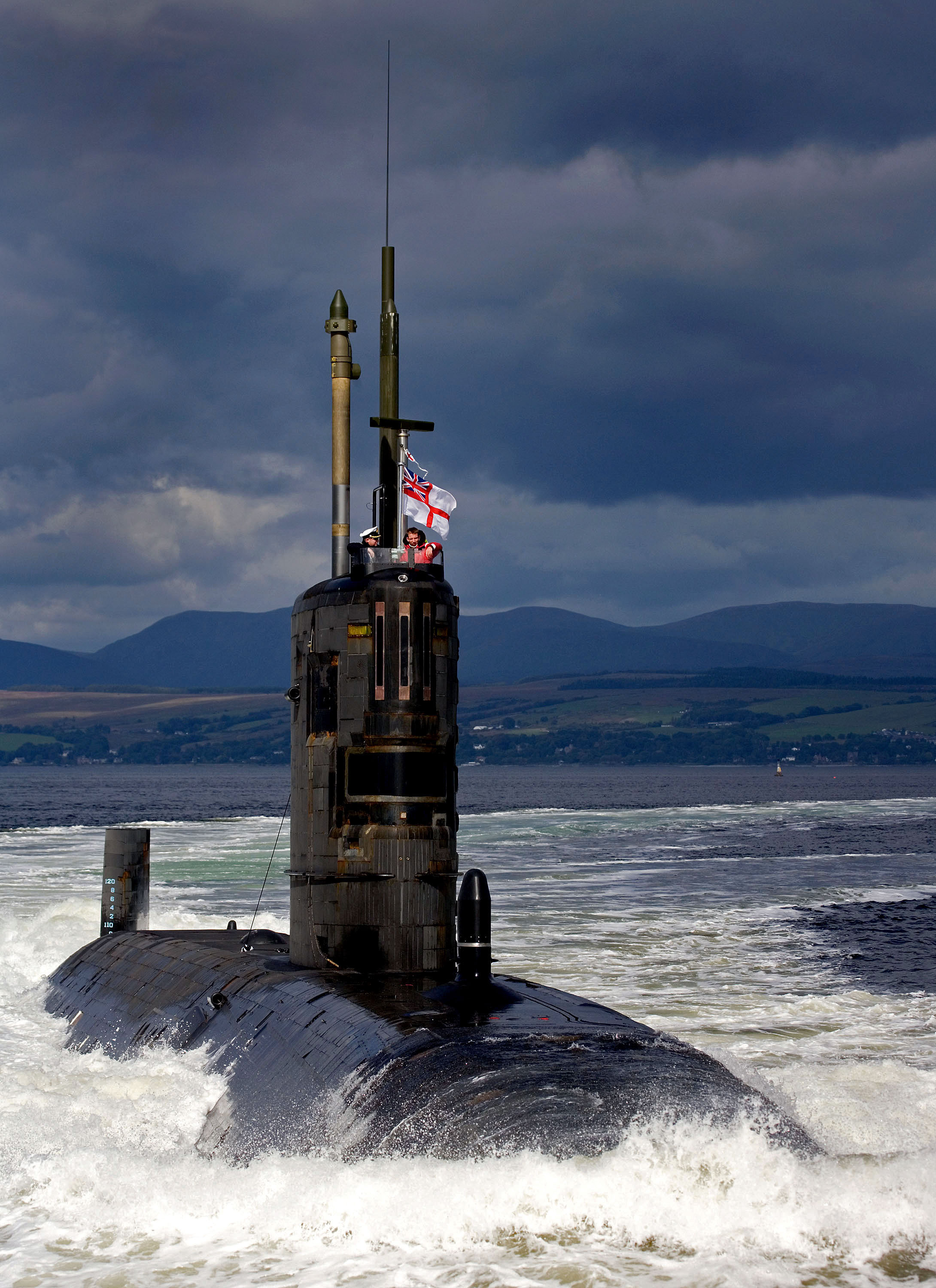
HMS Tireless: her commissioning pennant can be seen flying above and behind her white ensign

The commissioning pennant reflects the fact that the ship is a ship of war, and is flown until the ship is decommissioned. It is generally taken to signify the commissioned status of the warship. In some navies, the commissioning pennant is used in addition to represent the personal authority of the captain, although it is flown continuously aboard the ship whether the captain is aboard or not.

=== Hellenic Navy ===
The Hellenic Navy's commissioning pennant

In the Hellenic Navy, the commissioning pennant (Greek: Επισείων Πολεμικού Πλοίου, lit. 'Warship Pennant') is blue coloured, has shape of isosceles triangle elongated, bearing a white cross near the base of the triangle. The flag has typically base to length (height of triangle) 1 to 20. The cross has arms width 1/5 base length and each arm length 3/5 of base length. The pennant flown on the top of mainmast.

=== Indian Navy ===
The Indian Navy's commissioning pennant

In the Indian Navy, a white triangular pennant is flown with at hoist a gold-blue octagon bearing the crest of the Indian Navy in the center.

=== Indonesian Navy ===
The Indonesian Navy's commissioning pennant

In the Indonesian Navy, the commissioning pennant is called the War Pennant (Indonesian: Ular-Ular Perang) and has the same red and white colors of the Indonesian flag, except it is longer and shaped like a swallowtail flag. The pennant is flown in all Indonesian Navy ships and indicating that the ship is on active duty.

=== Japanese Navy ===
Masthead pennant of the Japan Maritime Self-Defense Force

=== Royal Navy ===
The Royal Navy's commissioning pennant

In the Royal Navy the commissioning pennant is flown continuously in every ship and establishment in commission unless displaced by a senior officer's Rank flag. The masthead pennant is a cross of St George in the hoist and a white fly. Formerly, when the Royal Navy was divided into red, white and blue squadrons, there were four different pennants in use, the colour of the fly of three of the pennants corresponding with the colour of the squadron ensign, and a fourth for ships on independent commission (i.e. not attached to a squadron, therefore directly under the command of the Admiralty in London), with the fly containing (from top to bottom) red white and blue in a triband form (such ships would wear the red ensign). Modern commissioning pennants are significantly shorter than in previous centuries - typically 1m in length and only 10 cm at the hoist, tapering to a squared-off point.

A boat carrying a captain of one of His Majesty's ships will on ceremonial occasions fly a commissioning pennant from the bows of the boat as a symbol of his authority.

This pennant is also used by the Royal Australian Navy and the Royal New Zealand Navy.

=== Royal Canadian Navy ===
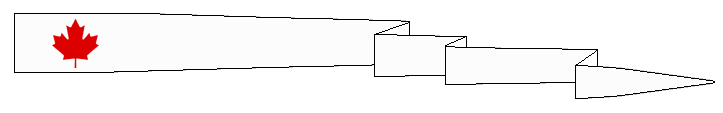
The Royal Canadian Navy's commissioning pennant

Since its creation in 1910, until 1990, the Royal Canadian Navy and afterwards, Maritime Command (after unification into the Canadian Armed Forces) used the same commissioning pennant as the Royal Navy. In 1990, the old version was phased out with a new design; replacing the Cross of Saint George with a stylized Canadian red maple leaf.

=== Russian Navy ===
1:30 proportion

1:12 proportion

The Russian Navy's commissioning pennants for ships (top) and boats (bottom)

=== South Korean Navy ===
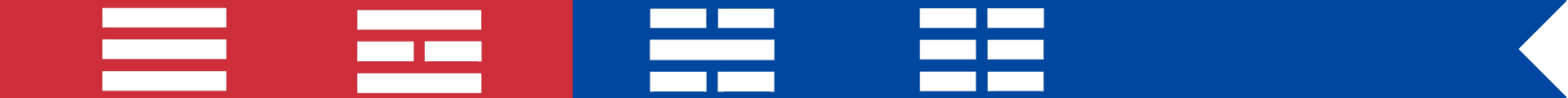
The South Korean Navy's commissioning pennant

=== Taiwanese Navy ===
The Taiwanese Navy's commissioning pennant

In the Republic of China (Taiwan) Navy, a red trapezoidal pennant is flown with the Blue Sky with a White Sun in the hoist. The flag has typically base to length 1 to 10, and hoist to fly 5 to 1.

=== Turkish Navy ===
The Turkish Navy's commissioning pennant

The Turkish masthead pennant (Turkish: Direk ucu flama) is one of the official symbols of the Turkish Naval Forces and Coast Guard. It consists of the crescent and star found on the Turkish flag and is triangular in size. Its use is also permitted on civilian ships and boats.

=== United States ===
==== United States Navy and United States Coast Guard ====
The commissioning pennant of the United States Navy is "blue at the hoist, bearing seven white stars; the rest of the pennant consists of single longitudinal stripes of red and white." The commissioning pennant of the United States Coast Guard is a near opposite, being "thirteen blue stars in a horizontal line on a white field, one-fourth the length of the pennant; the remaining three-fourths [consisting] of sixteen vertical stripes of equal width, alternate red and white, beginning with the red, and a tail piece of red about one-fifth the entire length of the pennant, ending in a swallow tail."

Ships of the United States Navy and the United States Coast Guard fly their respective commissioning pennants from the moment of commissioning until the decommissioning ceremony, the only exceptions being when either a flag officer or a civilian official is embarked and the flag officer's or civilian official's personal flag is flown in its place.

The ensign, jack and commissioning pennant are hoisted directly after the reading out of the commissioning order and struck as the final act before the captain declares the ship decommissioned.

The U.S. Navy and U.S. Coast Guard use the respective pennants as the symbol of the vessel's commanding officer.

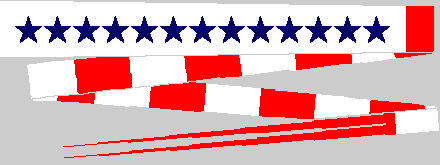
Commissioning pennants for the United States Navy (top) and United States Coast Guard (bottom)

When the vessel's commanding officer is ashore, the ship will also display the international code flag known as the Third Substitute pennant.

==== NOAA fleet ====
The National Oceanic and Atmospheric Administration (NOAA) operates a fleet of research and survey ships which are in commission for United States Government service, although they are not warships. Ships in the NOAA fleet fly a "commission pennant" in a similar manner to U.S. Navy and U.S. Coast Guard ships. The NOAA fleet has three commission pennants, one for its largest ships (which it deems "Class I" vessels), and two for smaller ships NOAA defines as "Class II," "Class III," or "Class IV" vessels. The pennant for Class I vessels is 15 feet (4.6 m) long and has 13 red triangles on a white background at the hoist, with the remainder of the pennant blue, while the pennants for Class II, III, and IV vessels are 9 and 4 feet (2.7 and 1.2 m) long and have seven red triangles but otherwise are identical in design to the Class I pennant.

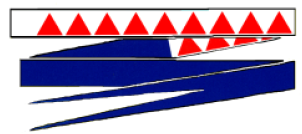
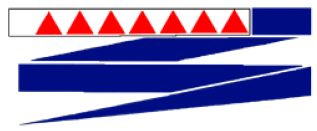
National Oceanic and Atmospheric Administration commission pennants for Class I vessels (top) and for Class II, III, and IV vessels (bottom); the Class I pennant is 15 feet (4.6 m) long, while the Class II, III, and IV pennant can be either 9 or 4 feet (2.7 or 1.2 m) long

The pennants are identical to those flown by commissioned ships of the United States Coast and Geodetic Survey, one of the ancestor organizations of NOAA, and the red triangles represent the discipline of triangulation used in hydrographic surveys. The flag of the U.S. Coast and Geodetic Survey, used from 1899 to 1970, and that of NOAA, in use since 1970, include a similar red triangle.

== Paying-off pennants ==
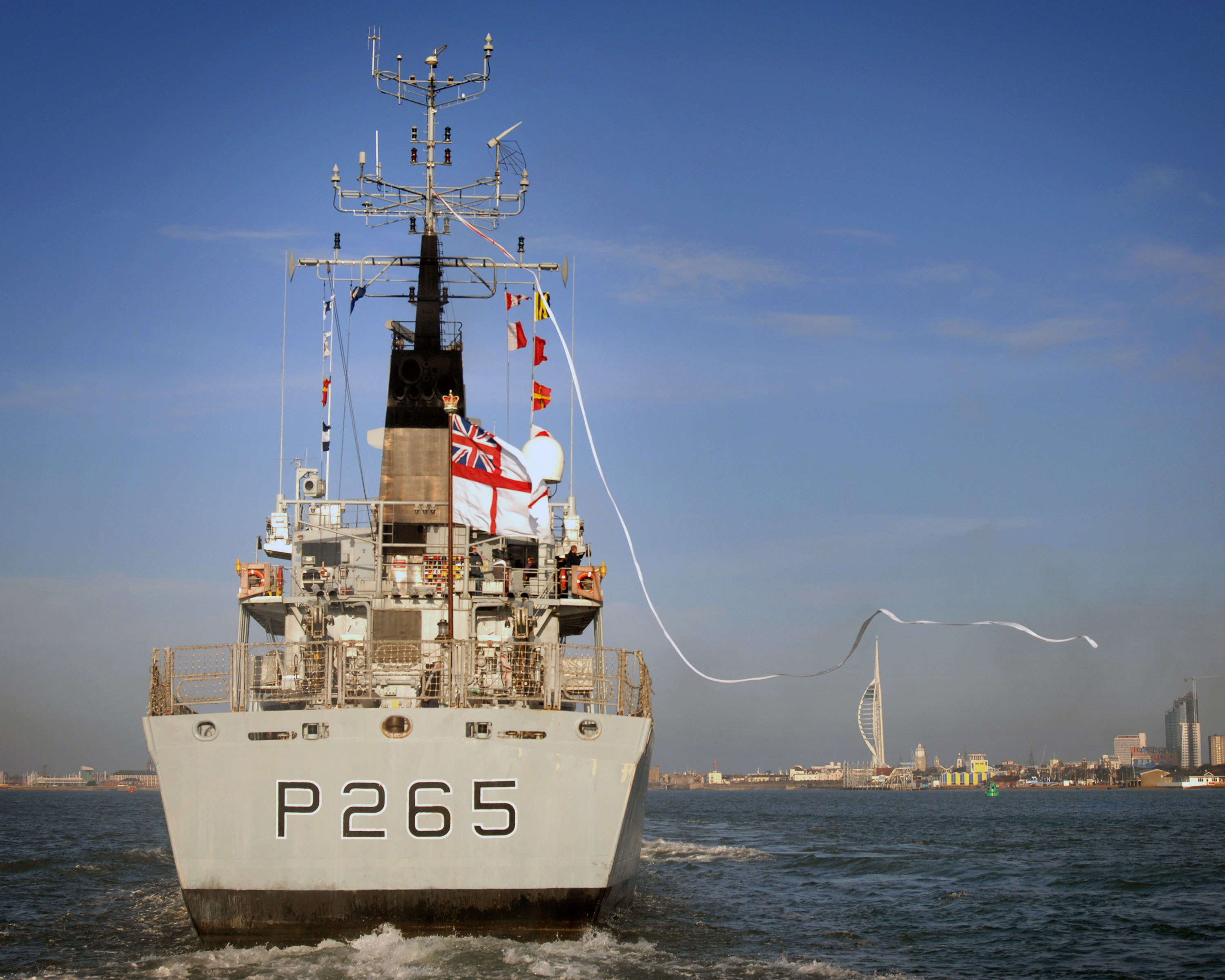
HMS Dumbarton Castle paying off

It is the custom in many navies for a ship which is "paying off" to wear an extremely long commissioning pennant, which is normally at least the length of the ship, and the length of which reflects the length of service. This is in contrast to the modern practice of using pennants of not more than one or one-and-a-half metres for convenience.

Formerly a ship "paid off" each time she returned home after a commission overseas: the term refers to the fact that sailors were not paid until the ship returned home, to avoid desertion. The bible of Royal Navy traditions and slang, Covey-Crump, emphasises:

It should be borne in mind that the commission referred to is the length of time the ship's company has been abroad, not the ship herself: when a ship recommissions abroad a fresh commission is started; thus a commission of longer than 2¾ years is exceptional.

This custom is maintained in the United States Navy, where the paying-off pennant is known as the "homeward-bound pennant". Nevertheless, present usage in the Royal Navy has degenerated to using paying-off pennants only as part of a ship's decommissioning ceremony.

== See also ==
- Flag terminology
- Maritime flag
- French ensigns
- Clean sweep (naval), involving the use of a broom
