= French schooner Étoile =

French naval training vessel

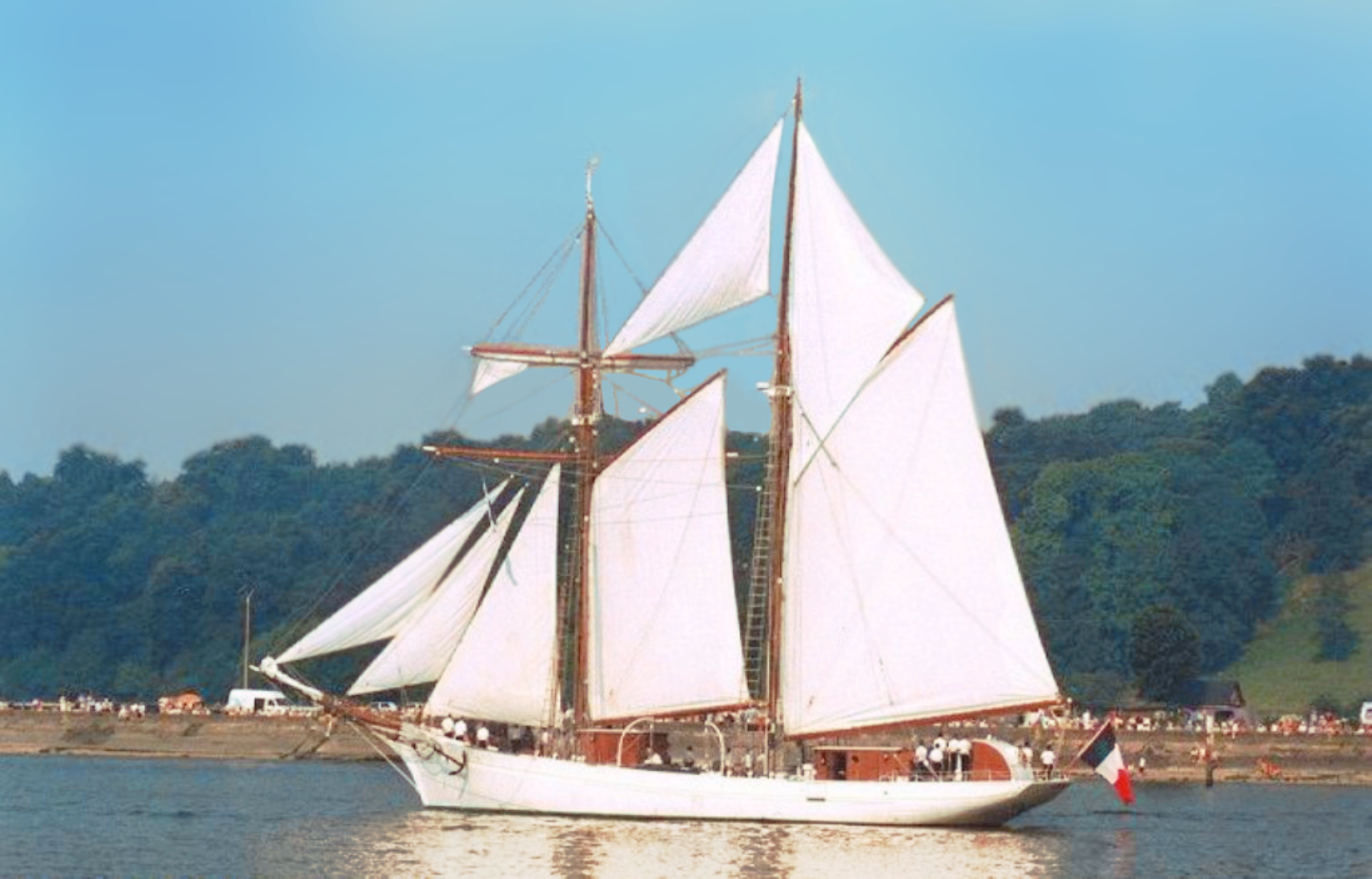

History

France
- Name: Étoile
- Namesake: "star"
- Launched: 1932
- Identification: MMSI number: 228797000; Callsign: FACF; Pennant number: A 649
- Status: In active service

General characteristics
- Type: Schooner
- Displacement: 225 tonnes
- Length: 37.50 m (123 ft 0 in)
- Beam: 7.40 m (24 ft 3 in)
- Draught: 3.65 m (12 ft 0 in)
- Propulsion: Sail; 1 × 285 hp (213 kW) Baudouin diesel engine
- Speed: 12.5 knots (23.2 km/h; 14.4 mph) under sail; 9 knots (17 km/h; 10 mph) on diesel
- Complement: 1 officer; 5 non-commissioned officers; 10 quartermasters; 20 trainees

Étoile ("star") is a French naval schooner used as a training vessel. She was built in 1932 as a replica of a cod fishing vessel used off Iceland, as a training ship of the students of the École navale. During the Second World War, Étoile sailed to the United Kingdom after the Fall of France and was used by the Free French Naval Forces, returning to Brest in 1945. The schooner as well as her sister ship Belle Poule are still used by the École Navale as training ships in European waters.

== Description and design ==
In the early 20th century, the French Navy scrapped its aging traditional sailing ships, Melpomène in 1904, and Borda in 1914. In the following years, it emerged that student officers would benefit from at least some sailing training. Since it would consist only in short cruises around Brest, France, rather than long cruises, the school decided not to build a three-masted ship. Instead, it chose a replica of a cod fishing schooner, which had the advantage of being both maneuverable, and strong enough to sustain the weather of the winter around Brest. in 1931, the Ministry of the Navy ordered two such ships, as to allow enough of the students to embark at the same time. The first was Belle Poule, and the second, Étoile.

Étoile was launched on 7 July 1932, at the unusual hour of 0100 in the morning. Lieutenant Richard, who oversaw construction for the Navy, was worried that Étoile would not be completed for the launch date, and had had an argument with Lemaistre, the engineer in charge of construction. Lemaistre proceeded to the launch in the night of the day chosen for the ceremony, and officials coming for the occasion were surprised to find Étoile already afloat.

== Career ==
From September 1932 Belle Poule and Étoile served with the École navale in their normal role. In the morning of 18 June 1940, Lieutenant-Commander Cros, in charge of both schooners, was ordered to prepare for evacuating the students of the school in the face of the German invasion of France. The crew of both ships were ready by 1400, and they departed at 1500. At 1700, they had joined Président Théodore Tissier, Jean-Frédéric and Notre-Dame-de-France. The ships crossed the English Channel during the night, and arrived at Falmouth on 19 June around 1700.

The British boarded Belle Poule in the night of 2 July as part of Operation Catapult, taking the French personnel prisoner. They turned the ships to the FNFL on 20 September. Both ships were demagnetised as a precaution against mines, and armed with two 8 mm (0.315 in) Hotchkiss Mle 1914 machine guns. On 16 November 1940, the Belle Poule and Étoile left Falmouth and sailed to Portsmouth to join the Free French naval school, held on Président-Théodore-Tissier. Two days later, they were attacked by a bomber, but the four bombs that it released fell hundreds of metres away and did not cause damage. From November 1940 Étoile underwent a refit, when she was painted grey, and she was used as a store ship for the gunnery school HMS Excellent.

On 15 April 1944, Belle Poule and Étoile departed for West Hartlepool, Étoile towing Belle Poule for most of the journey due to an engine failure. They arrived on 13 May and were put in the reserve. In late September 1945, Belle Poule and Étoile returned to Brest. From October they were appointed to the École navale again, but were in such bad condition that they stayed under refit until mid-1947. Their engines were replaced with 89 kW (120 hp) Deutz AG engines taken from German trucks.

Belle Poule and Étoile sail around Brest during the winter, and occasionally participate in meetings during the summer, mainly in European waters. In 1975, they had a refit, and the engines were replaced with 183 kW (245 shp) Baudoin DNP8. In 2009, they crossed the Atlantic to New York.

== Sources and references ==
=== Bibliography ===
- Béquignon, Jean-Yves; Rozen, André (2000). Institut Océanographique (ed.). L'Étoile et la Belle-Poule (in French). Vol. 2. Imprimerie IFC. ISBN 2268071820.
- Roche, Jean-Michel (2005). Dictionnaire des Bâtiments de la Flotte de Guerre Française de Colbert à nos Jours (in French). Vol. 2. Group Retozel-Maury Millau.
- Saunders, Stephen, ed. (2009). Jane's Fighting Ships 2009–2010 (112 ed.). Alexandria, Virginia: Jane's Information Group Inc. ISBN 978-0-7106-2888-6.
- Schauffelen, Otmar (2005). Chapman Great Sailing Ships of the World. New York: Hearst Books. ISBN 1-58816-384-9.
- Sharpe, Richard, ed. (1990). Jane's Fighting Ships 1990–91 (93 ed.). Surrey, United Kingdom: Jane's Information Group. ISBN 0-7106-0904-3.
- "Étoile et Belle-Poule, les goélettes de l'École navale". Chasse-Marée. 92 (September 1995): 22–33. 1995.
