= French schooner Belle Poule =

French naval vessel

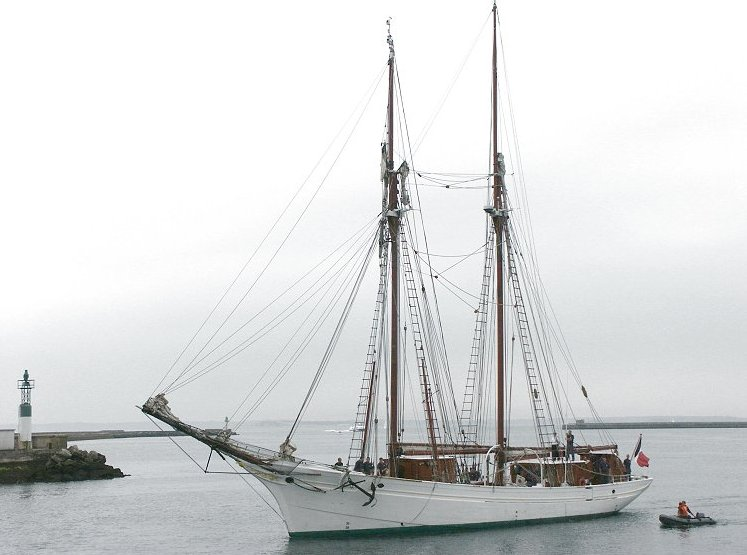
- Belle Poule in 2003

History

France
- Name: Belle Poule
- Laid down: late July 1931
- Launched: 8 February 1932
- Identification: Pennant number A 650; MMSI number: 228796000; Callsign: FBPU
- Status: In active service

General characteristics
- Type: Schooner
- Displacement: 279 t (275 long tons)
- Length: 37.5 m (123 ft 0 in)
- Beam: 7.4 m (24 ft 3 in)
- Draught: 3.7 m (12 ft 2 in)
- Propulsion: 450 m^{2} (4,800 sq ft) sails; 1 × 213 kW (285 hp) Baudouin DNP 8 diesel engine
- Speed: 9 knots (17 km/h; 10 mph) on diesel
- Complement: 30 student officers; 5 petty officers; 12 seamen; 3 officers

Belle Poule is a French Navy schooner in service as a training vessel, and the fourth ship of that name in the French Navy. She was built in 1932 as a replica of a cod fishing vessel used off Iceland, as a training ship of the students of the École navale. During the Second World War, Belle Poule sailed to the United Kingdom after the Fall of France and was used by the Free French Naval Forces, returning to Brest in 1945. The schooner as well as her sister ship Étoile are still used by the École Navale as training ships in European waters.

== Design and construction ==
In the early 20th century, the French Navy scrapped its aging traditional sailing ships, Melpomène in 1904, and Borda in 1914. In the following years, it emerged that student officers would benefit from at least some sailing training. Since it would consist only in short cruises around Brest rather than long cruises, the school decided not to build a three-masted ship. Instead, it chose a replica of a cod fishing schooner, which had the advantage of being both maneuverable, and strong enough to sustain the weather of the winter around Brest. in 1931, the Ministry of the Navy ordered two such ships, as to allow enough of the students to embark at the same time. The first was Belle Poule, and the second, Étoile.

The Navy ordered the ships from Chantiers de Normandie at Fecamp. Construction was supervised by Lieutenant Richard for the Navy, and engineers Chantelot and Lemaistre for the shipyard. The ships could accommodated 30 student officers, 5 petty officers 12 seamen and 3 officers. Construction of Belle Poule began in late July 1931, and she was launched on 8 February 1932.

During her trials, Belle Poule managed 6 knots (11 km/h; 6.9 mph) on engines. With sails, she achieved 8.5 knots (15.7 km/h; 9.8 mph) close-hauled and 12 knots (22 km/h; 14 mph) broad reach.

== Characteristics ==
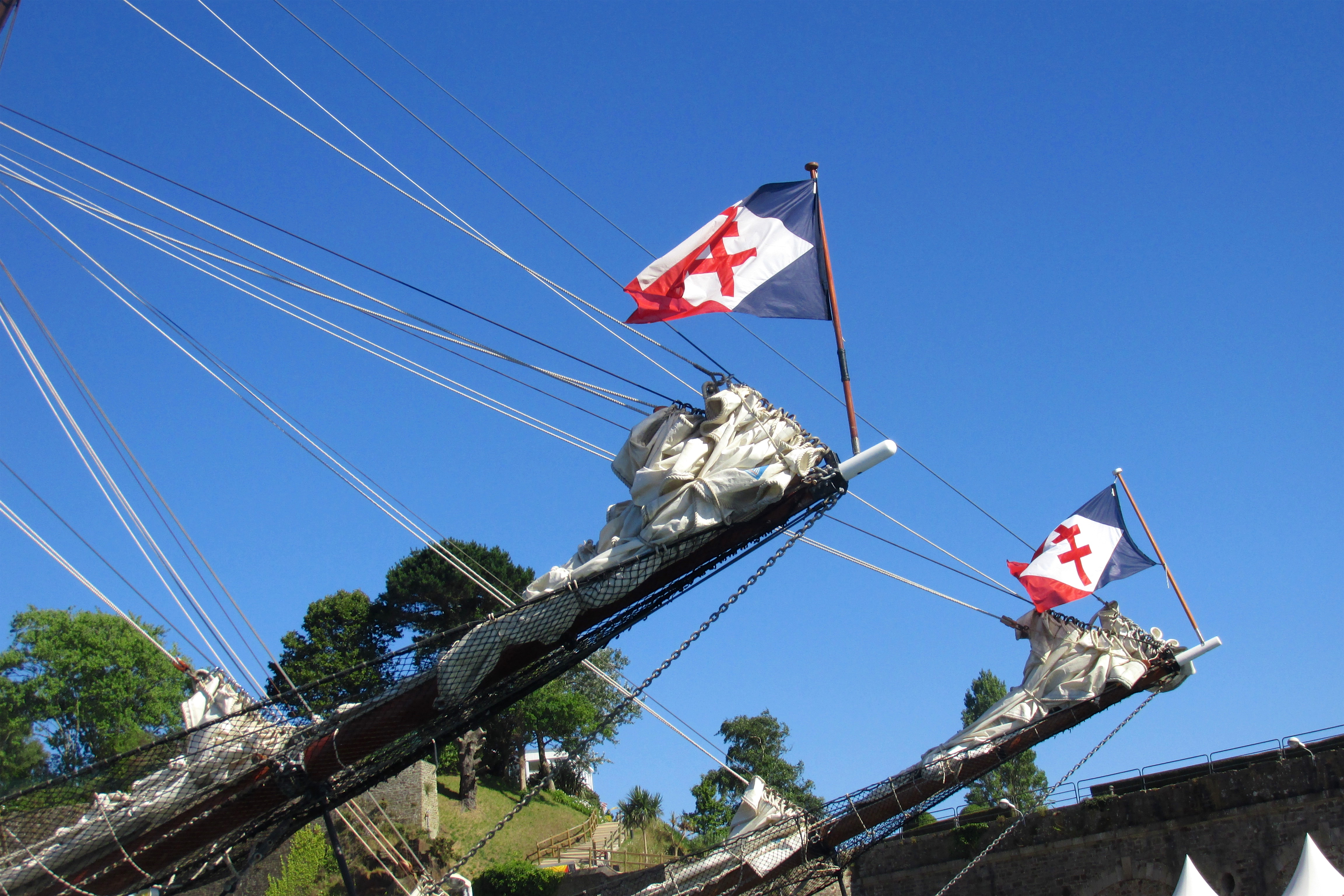
FNFL flag, still flown today.

Belle Poule is a replica of a type of fishing vessel that was used until 1935 off Iceland for catching cod. The ship has a standard displacement of 231 tonnes (227 long tons) and 279 tonnes (275 long tons) at full load. The schooner is 37.5 m (123 ft 0 in) long with a beam of 7.4 m (24 ft 3 in) and a draught of 3.7 m (12 ft 2 in).

Belle Poule is propelled by 450 m^{2} (4,800 sq ft) of sails and an auxiliary Baudouin DNP 8 diesel engine turning one shaft rated at 213 kilowatts (285 hp), replacing her original a Sulzer diesel engine, rated at 93 kilowatts (125 bhp). Her maximum speed in 9 knots (17 km/h; 10 mph) on diesel engine. The propeller has only two blades, and can be stopped and locked vertically, as not to hinder the nautical qualities of the hull.

As a former ship of the Free French Naval Forces (French: Forces Navales Françaises Libres, or FNFL), Belle Poule still flies the flag with the Cross of Loraine in honour of her role during the Second World War.

== Career ==
From September 1932 Belle Poule and Étoile served with the École navale in their normal role. In the morning of 18 June 1940, Lieutenant-Commander Cros, in charge of both schooners, was ordered to prepare for evacuating the students of the school in the face of the German invasion of France. By 14:00pm, both ships were manned, and they departed at 15:00pm. At 17:00pm, they had joined Président-Théodore-Tissier, Jean-Frédéric and Notre-Dame-de-France. The ships crossed the English Channel during the night, and arrived at Falmouth on 19 June around 17:00pm. The British boarded Belle Poule in the night of 2 July as part of Operation Catapult, taking some French personnel prisoner while some of the French personnel join the Free French Naval Forces. They restituted the ships to the FNFL on 20 September. Both ships were de-magnetised as a precaution against mines, and armed with two 8 mm (0.31 in) Hotchkiss Mle 1914 machine guns.

On 16 November 1940, Belle Poule and Étoile left Falmouth and sailed to Portsmouth to join the Free French naval school, held on Président-Théodore-Tissier. On 18 November, they came under attack from a bomber, but the four bombs that it released fell hundreds of metres away and did not cause damage. From November 1940, Belle Poule sailed each day of the week to train gunners, helmsmen, gabiers and commandos for the FNFL and for the Royal Navy, with Ensign Walmeyer acting as a liaison officer. Because she was moored next to the battleship Courbet, Belle Poule was regularly under attack from German planes. On 10 January 1941, she sustained two hits from incendiary bombs, and an officer, Blonsard, was seriously wounded fighting the fire. King George VI and Queen Elizabeth paid the ships a visit, and Blonsard was awarded the Croix de Guerre for saving Belle Poule.

On 15 April 1944, Belle Poule and Étoile departed for West Hartlepool, Étoile towing Belle Poule for most of the journey due to an engine failure. They arrived on 13 May and were placed in reserve. In late September 1945, Belle Poule and Étoile returned to Brest. From October they were appointed to the École navale again, but were in such bad condition that they stayed under refit until mid-1947. Their engines were replaced with 89 kW (120 hp) Deutz AG engines taken from German trucks.

Belle Poule and Étoile sail around Brest during the winter, and occasionally participate in meetings during the summer, mainly in European waters. In 1975, they had a refit, and the engines were replaced with 183 kW (245 shp) Baudoin DNP8. In 2009, they crossed the Atlantic to New York. Since 13 May 1978 Belle Poule has been sponsored by the city of Pauillac. Belle Poule underwent a refit in 2006.

== Bibliography ==
- Béquignon, Jean-Yves; Rozen, André (2000). Institut Océanographique (ed.). L'Étoile et la Belle-Poule (in French). Vol. 2. Imprimerie IFC. ISBN 2268071820.
- Roche, Jean-Michel (2005). Dictionnaire des Bâtiments de la Flotte de Guerre Française de Colbert à nos Jours (in French). Vol. 2. Group Retozel-Maury Millau.
- Saunders, Stephen, ed. (2009). Jane's Fighting Ships 2009–2010 (112 ed.). Alexandria, Virginia: Jane's Information Group Inc. ISBN 978-0-7106-2888-6.
- Schauffelen, Otmar (2005). Chapman Great Sailing Ships of the World. New York: Hearst Books. ISBN 1-58816-384-9.
- Sharpe, Richard, ed. (1990). Jane's Fighting Ships 1990–91 (93 ed.). Surrey, United Kingdom: Jane's Information Group. ISBN 0-7106-0904-3.
- "Étoile et Belle-Poule, les goélettes de l'École navale". Chasse-Marée. 92 (September 1995): 22–33. 1995.
