= Royal coat of arms =

Royal coat of arms, Royal Coat of Arms or Royal Arms may refer to:

- Coat of arms of Cambodia, the coat of arms of the Cambodian monarch and Cambodia
- Coat of arms of Canada, the coat of arms of the Canadian monarch and Canada
- Coat of arms of Denmark, the coat of arms of the Danish monarchy
- Coat of arms of England, the coat of arms of the English monarchy and England from the 12th century to 1707
- Coat of arms of Great Britain, the coat of arms of the monarchy of Great Britain and Great Britain from 1707 to 1800
- Coat of arms of Scotland, the coat of arms of the Scottish monarchy and Scotland from the 12th century to 1707
- Coat of arms of the United Kingdom, the coat of arms of the monarchy of the United Kingdom and the United Kingdom
