= French frigate Melpomène (1890) =

History

France
- Name: Melpomène
- Namesake: Melpomene
- Ordered: 9 August 1887
- Builder: Rochefort
- Laid down: 19 October 1883
- Launched: 20 August 1887
- Commissioned: 15 September 1890
- Decommissioned: 1904
- Fate: Scrapped 1943

General characteristics
- Type: Frigate
- Length: 53.5 metres
- Beam: 13.8 metres
- Draught: 6.5 metres
- Propulsion: 1769 m² of sails
- Sail plan: Full-rigged ship
- Complement: 180 men
- Armament: 8 138mm guns; 4 37mm guns

Melpomène was a schoolship frigate of the French Navy.

== Career ==
Melpomène was ordered in August 1883 as a replacement for Résolue, to serve as a gabier schoolship. She departed for her first training cruise on 23 August 1890, sailing to Dakar and calling the Canary Islands and Tenerife on the way, before returning to Brest on 25 May 1891.

She performed similar cruises in the following years until 1904.

== Fate ==
In 1904, Melpomène was struck from the Navy lists. She was hulked in Lorient in 1923. On 19 June 1940, she sank at her mooring, and was broken up in 1943.

== Legacy ==
Melpomène was the subject of a post stamp in 1974.
