= Indian Armed Forces rank flags =

The Indian Armed Forces follow the UK/Commonwealth ranking system, and their general and flag officers use rank flags.

== Indian Armed Forces ==
Flag	Date	Use	Description
		Flag of the Indian Armed Forces	A horizontal tricolour of red, navy blue and sky blue with the tri-service emblem at the centre.
		Flag of the Chief of Defence Staff	A red field with the flag of India in the canton, and the tri-service emblem.
		Flag of the Integrated Defence Staff (also Chief of Integrated Defence Staff)	A red field with the flag of India in the canton. There is an insignia of two crossed swords, an eagle, an anchor, and an Ashok symbol above it.

== Indian Army ==
Flag	Date	Use	Description
		Flag of the Indian Army	A red field with the flag of India in the canton, and the Army badge in the fly.
		Flag of the Field Marshal	Red flag with crossed batons surrounded by a lotus flower wreath, the Ashoka lion emblem above the batons and five five-pointed stars across the bottom, all in yellow.
		Flag of the Chief of the Army Staff	Red flag with the national flag in the canton, with two crossed swords and the Ashoka lions emblem above them in the center of the flag and four five-pointed stars in a vertical line in the fly, all yellow.
		Flag of the General	
		Flag of the Vice Chief of the Army Staff	
		Flag of the Lieutenant General	
		Flag of the Principal Staff Officer	
		Flag of the Major General	
		Flag of the Brigadier	

== Indian Navy ==
=== Current rank flags (2022–present) ===
Flag	Date	Use	Description
		Flag of the Indian Navy	A white ensign, featuring the Flag of India in the canton, and a navy blue filled, gold-bordered octagon, enclosing the crest of the Indian Navy, located in the fly.
		Commissioning pennant of the Indian Navy	A white triangular pennant with a gold-bordered octagon enclosing the crest of the Indian Navy in the hoist.
		President's Colour of the Indian Navy	Indian Naval ensign with State Emblem of India.
		Flag of the Admiral (rank currently reserved for the Chief of the Naval Staff)	A white flag with a gold-bordered octagon enclosing the crest of the Indian Navy in the middle, and four blue stars in the hoist side.
		Flag of the Vice admiral (also Vice Chief of the Naval Staff)	A white flag with a gold-bordered octagon enclosing the crest of the Indian Navy in the middle, and three blue stars in the hoist side.
		Flag of the Rear admiral	A white flag with a gold-bordered octagon enclosing the crest of the Indian Navy in the middle, and two blue stars on the hoist side.
		Flag of the Commodore	A white flag with a gold-bordered octagon enclosing the crest of the Indian Navy in the middle, and one blue star on the hoist side.

=== Former rank flags (1950–2001; 2004–2022) ===
Flag	Date	Use	Description
	1950–2001	Indian Naval Ensign	A red cross on a white field, with the Indian national flag in the canton.
	2004–2014	Indian Naval Ensign	A red cross on a white field, with the Indian state emblem in yellow at the center, with the Indian national flag in the canton.
	2014–2022	Indian Naval Ensign	A red cross on a white field, with the Indian state emblem in yellow at the center with the motto Satyamev Jayate below, and the Indian national flag in the canton.
	1951–2022	President's Colour	Indian Naval ensign with Presidential Standard elephant.
		Commissioning pennant	A white triangular pennant with at the hoist the St. George's red cross defaced with the Ashoka Chakra.
		Flag of the Admiral (was only used by Chief of the Naval Staff)	
		Flag of the Vice Admiral (also Vice Chief of the Naval Staff)	
		Flag of the Rear Admiral	
		Flag of the Commodore	
		Flag of the Senior officer	

=== Former rank flags (2001–2004) ===
Flag	Date	Use	Description
	2001–2004	Flag of the Indian Navy	A blue-colored crest of the Indian Navy set upon a white background, with the flag of India placed in the canton.
	2001–2004	Commissioning pennant of the Indian Navy	
	2001–2004	Flag of Admiral of the Fleet of the Indian Navy	Never used.
	2001–2004	Flag of Admiral of the Indian Navy	
	2001–2004	Flag of Vice Admiral of the Indian Navy	
	2001–2004	Flag of Rear Admiral of the Indian Navy	
	2001–2004	Flag of Commodore of the Indian Navy	
	2001–2004	Flag of Senior Officer of the Indian Navy	

== Indian Air Force ==
=== Current rank flags (1980–present) ===
Flag	Date	Use	Description
		Flag of the Indian Air Force	A sky-blue ensign with the flag of India in the canton, the Air Force roundel in the lower fly, and the IAF badge in the upper fly.
		President's Colour of the Indian Air Force	Air Force ensign with Presidential Standard elephant.
		Flag of the Marshal of the Indian Air Force	Sky blue flag with the badge of the IAF in the center, and 5 five-pointed gold stars in a vertical line in the fly. Only one person has ever been granted the right to this flag.
		Flag of the Air Chief Marshal (rank currently reserved for the Chief of the Air Staff)	Sky blue flag with the national flag in the canton, the IAF roundel in the lower fly, the IAF badge in the upper fly, and 5 five-pointed gold stars in a vertical line in the fly.
		Flag of the Air Marshal (also Vice Chief of the Air Staff)	Sky blue flag with IAF roundel in the center surmounted by eagle; 3 five-pointed gold stars in a vertical line in the fly.
		Flag of the Air Vice Marshal	Sky blue flag with IAF roundel in the center surmounted by an eagle; 2 five-pointed gold stars in a vertical line in the fly.
		Flag of the Air Commodore	Sky blue flag with IAF roundel in the center surmounted by an eagle; 1 five-pointed gold star in the fly.
		Flag of the Group Captain	Flag of a sky blue triangular pennant with an IAF roundel in the center surmounted by an eagle.
		Flag of the Wing Commander	Sky blue triangular pennant with IAF roundel in the center.

=== Former rank flags (till 2023) ===
Flag	Date	Use	Description
	1950–2023	Flag of the Indian Air Force	A sky-blue ensign with the flag of India in the canton, and the Air Force roundel in the fly.
	1980–2023	Flag of the Air Chief Marshal (was only used by Chief of the Air Staff)	Sky blue flag with the national flag in the canton, the IAF roundel in the lower fly, and the IAF badge in the upper fly.

=== Former rank flags (1950–1980) ===
The former IAF rank flags were modeled on those of the Royal Air Force, with different colours.

Flag	Date	Use	Description
	1950–1980	Marshal of the Indian Air Force	Never used.
	1950–1980	Air Chief Marshal of the Indian Air Force	Sky blue bordered with two thick golden yellow stripes and with two thick horizontal green stripes in the center.
	1950–1980	Air Marshal of the Indian Air Force	Sky blue flag bordered with two thick horizontal golden yellow stripes, with one thick horizontal green stripe in the center.
	1950–1980	Air Vice Marshal of the Indian Air Force	Sky blue flag bordered with two thick horizontal golden yellow stripes, with two thin horizontal green stripes in the center.
	1950–1980	Air Commodore of the Indian Air Force	Swallowtail sky blue pennant bordered with two thick horizontal golden yellow stripes, with one thin horizontal green stripe in the center.
	1950–1980	Group Captain of the Indian Air Force	Triangular sky blue pennant bordered in golden yellow, with one thick horizontal green stripe in the center.
	1950–1980	Wing Commander of the Indian Air Force	Triangular sky blue pennant bordered in golden yellow, with two thin horizontal green stripes in the center.
	1950–1980	Squadron Leader of the Indian Air Force	Sky blue flag bordered with two thick horizontal golden yellow stripes, with one thin horizontal green stripe in the center surmounted by an eagle in green. Below the stripe is the squadron number.

== Indian Coast Guard ==
Flag	Date	Use	Description
		Flag of the Indian Coast Guard	A Blue Ensign with the Flag of India in the canton, and the Coast Guard badge in the fly.
		Flag of the Director General of the Indian Coast Guard	A Blue Ensign with the Flag of India in the canton, and the Coast Guard badge in the fly.
		Flag of the Additional Director General of the Indian Coast Guard	
		Flag of the Inspector-General of the Indian Coast Guard	
		Flag of the Deputy Inspector-General of the Indian Coast Guard	
		Flag of the Commandant of the Indian Coast Guard	

== See also ==
- Armed Forces Flag Day
- Indian Naval Ensign
- List of Indian flags
- Flag of India
