= Karnataka Khadi Gramodyoga Samyukta Sangha =

Indian manufacturing federation

The Karnataka Khadi Gramodyoga Samyukta Sangha (KKGSS) is a manufacturing federation located in Garag village near Dharwad City and also its headquarters in Bengeri of Hubli City in Dharwad district, Karnataka, India. It is one of the five units in India that are authorised by the Bureau of Indian Standards (BIS) to manufacture and supply the Indian flag.

== History ==
KKGSS was founded on 1 November 1957 with the goal of creating a federation that catered to the need for growth of khadi and other village industries. Another aim of the federation was to provide employment opportunities to the rural youth in these sectors. About 58 institutions around the state were brought under the aegis of this federation. The head office is located in Hubli and is spread over an area of 17 acres (69,000 m^{2}) of land. The production of khadi began in the year 1982. A training college to train students in textile chemistry is also run by this federation. The goal of this college is to produce technicians who will improve the quality of fabrics.

== Production ==
The main product of the KKGSS is the Indian flag. Apart from this, it also manufactures khadi clothes, khadi carpets, khadi bags, khadi caps, khadi bedsheets, soaps, handmade paper and processed honey. KKGSS also manufactures tools needed for carpentry, dyeing and blacksmithy and also has a naturopathy hospital in its premises. At first, the flags were not manufactured according to the BIS guidelines. The unit that manufactures the National flag was accredited with ISI certification, along with the authorization to sell the National Flag throughout the country on 18 February 2004. Currently, the flags are manufactured in accordance with the BIS guidelines, i.e. the national flag “should be made of hand-spun and handwoven cotton khadi bunting.”

=== Indian flag ===
Indian National Flag Flag ratio: 2:3

The flag is manufactured by the khadi unit of KKGSS. The Khadi and Village Industries Commission has certified KKGSS as one of the manufacturers and suppliers of the Indian flag to the entire country. There are 100 specialist spinners and 100 weavers employed in making the flag. The cloth needed for the flag is sourced from KKGSS's unit in Bagalkot and divided into three lots, each of the lots to be dyed with one of the three major colors in the Indian flag. After dyeing, the cloth is cut in the required size and shape and the blue chakra (wheel) with 24 equally spaced spokes is printed on the white cloth. Finally, the three pieces are stitched together to make the Indian flag. About 60 Japanese sewing machines are used to maintain precision while stitching. Some of the critical confirmation criteria include that the width and length of the entire flag should be in the ratio of 2:3 and that the chakra needs to be printed on both the sides of the flag with both of these prints perfectly matched, like two hands joined palm to palm. Each lot shipped is subjected to an inspection by BIS and any issue with a single flag could result in the whole lot being rejected. The flags are manufactured in nine sizes:

Sizes of the National Flag
| Flag size | Width and height (mm) | Diameter of Ashoka Chakra (mm) |
|---|---|---|
| 1 | 6300 × 4200 | 1295 |
| 2 | 3600 × 2400 | 740 |
| 3 | 2700 × 1800 | 555 |
| 4 | 1800 × 1200 | 370 |
| 5 | 1350 × 900 | 280 |
| 6 | 900 × 600 | 185 |
| 7 | 450 × 300 | 90 |
| 8 | 225 × 150 | 40 |
| 9 | 150 × 100 | 25 |

== Business ==
KKGSS's annual turnover is about ₹15 million ($375,000). The major customers of KKGSS are politicians and people associated with politics. This is because Khadi symbolised self-reliance during the Indian independence movement and was worn by Mahatma Gandhi and other leaders. In the year 2007, KKGSS has sold flags worth ₹6 million ($150,000).
