= Indian Naval Ensign =

Flag of the Indian Navy

- Use: Naval ensign
- Proportion: 1:2
- Adopted: 2 September 2022 (most recent revision)
- Design: A White Ensign, featuring the flag of India in the canton, and a navy blue filled, gold-bordered octagon, enclosing the crest of the Indian Navy, located in the fly.

The Indian Naval Ensign, also referred to as the Indian White Ensign, or Nishaan, is the naval ensign of the Indian Navy (IN), used aboard Indian naval vessels, shore establishments and naval air stations as its principal form of maritime identification.

== Colonial-era ensigns ==
The blue ensign of the Star of India was used from 1879–1892 as the naval ensign of Her Majesty's Indian Marine (1879–1892). It was then used by the Royal Indian Marine (1892–1934), subsequently upgraded to the Royal Indian Navy (1934–1950). The White Ensign of the Royal Navy (RN) was used from 1928–1950 as the naval ensign of the Royal Indian Marine and then the Royal Indian Navy (RIN).

Following the reconstitution of the Royal Indian Marine as a combatant force in 1928, the White Ensign - the naval ensign of the RN, was adopted, and was subsequently raised for the first time on 11 November 1928.

=== Pre-1947 ===
Colonial-era flags
Period	Ensign	Jack
1879–1884		
1884–1928		
1928–1947		

== Independence-era ensigns ==
=== 1947–2001 ===
Following India's emergence as an independent nation on 15 August 1947, the RIN continued the use of the White Ensign as its preferred choice, until 26 January 1950, when the country formally became a republic. Correspondingly thereafter, the RIN was re-christened the Indian Navy (IN), while the service's crest and flags were duly changed to India-centric configurations. However, the White Ensign, featuring the St. George's Cross over a white field, was retained, with the replacement of the Union Jack with the Flag of India being the only alteration.

Following the ensign's institution, a commissioning pendant and naval rank flags were also introduced. Based on the rank flags of the Royal Navy, the new rank flags of the IN also exhibited the St. George's Cross, albeit with the Ashoka Chakra, a Dharmachakra (Wheel of Law), a national symbol, in the intersection of the cross, as an extra addition. In line with naval tradition of the former service, each rank flag bore a display of red balls in the flag's quadrant, representing the naval officer's rank - zero balls for the Chief of the Naval Staff (an admiral by rank), one ball for vice admirals, two balls for rear admirals and again one ball for commodores. In addition to these measures, a presidential standard, based on the modified ensign was also introduced, featuring a gold-colored elephant in the fly, symbolising strength and courage, as an added feature.

Originally, the ensign was made in a proportional ratio of 1:2, but by the 1980s, it had been altered to 2:3, while the presidential standard was made in 4:5 proportions.

Flag	Jack	Ensign	Commissioning pennant
Pattern		(1947–1950) (1950–2001)	(1947-1950) (1950–2001)

Rank	Admiral	Vice Admiral	Rear Admiral	Commodore	Senior Officer
Pattern	(1947–1950) (1950-2001)	(1947–1950) (1950-2001)	(1947-1950) (1950-2001)	(1947-1950) (1950-2001)	(1947-1950) (1950-2001)

=== 2001–2004 ===
By the early 1970s, amidst decolonization, the desire for the introduction of a new ensign bereft of any colonial-era identity became very strong within the ranks of the IN. The impulse for a new, domestic-centric ensign was further amplified by the examples of Australia and New Zealand, which abolished the St. George's Cross from their respective naval ensigns in 1967 and 1968, respectively. However, the original idea for a post-colonial ensign is generally credited to Vice Admiral V.E.C. Barboza, a former Flag Officer Commanding-in-Chief Western Naval Command, who suggested the change around the same period.

Consequently, the Union Government, then led by the National Democratic Alliance, chaired by Prime Minister Atal Bihari Vajpayee, changed the naval ensign in 2001, to a newer design featuring a blue-colored crest of the IN set upon a white background, with the Flag of India placed in the canton. The change, derived from the objective of simplicity and the necessity to maintain commonality with the flags of the Indian Army and the Indian Air Force, was approved by the President of India on 30 April 2001, and came into effect on 15 August 2001.

The naval rank flags, which too had portrayed the St. George's Cross, were changed to a newer pattern, based on the ensign. The new rank flags depicted the blue-colored naval crest at the hoist, while rank-specific stars were placed at the fly - four for the Chief of the Naval Staff, three for vice admirals, two for rear admirals and one for commodores. A five-star rank flag was also created separately as an honorary measure for the position of fleet admiral; however, the rank has never been never conferred to this day. The proportion of the ensign, and the rank flags had 2:3 proportions, while the commodore's broad pennant and the Senior Officer's pennant had 1:2 proportions. Irrespective of the changes, the national flag continued to serve as the naval jack, while the Indian Blue Ensign, meant for the naval reserve, remained untouched.

Nevertheless, the new ensign was a troubled and unpopular change, as many complained that the blue of the naval crest was indistinguishable from the sky and the ocean, when viewed from afar. Ultimately, in 2004, after three years in service, the IN retired the use of the altered ensign, reverting to the use of its former one. Following the decision of its impending replacement, the altered ensign and its corresponding flags were subsequently flown for the final time on 24 April 2004.

Flag	Jack	Ensign	Commissioning pennant
Pattern			

Rank	Admiral of the fleet	Admiral	Vice Admiral	Rear Admiral	Commodore	Senior Officer
Pattern						

=== 2004–2022 ===
In the wake of the troubled use of the altered ensign and its subsequent discontinuation, the Vajpayee-government reintroduced a modified variant of the former naval ensign, on 25 April 2004. The new, modified version bore the St. George's Cross, albeit with an additional touch-up of the State Emblem of India at the intersection, as an added feature. The proportions of the ensign was reverted to the ratio of 1:2, while the original rank flags were restored, except for the pennant of the Senior Officer, which was redesigned to match the other rank flags.

In 2014, the ensign was further customized to feature the Indian national motto in the Devanagari script: सत्यमेव जयते (Satyameva Jayate), translated in English as "Truth Alone Triumphs", beneath the State Emblem. The updated ensign was accorded presidential approval in July 2014 and was formally adopted on 15 August 2014. The ensign remained in active use until 1 September 2022, when the Indian Navy announced that its design would be revised in a favor of a new, domestic-centric one.

Flag	Jack	Ensign	Commissioning pennant	Presidential colour
Pattern		(2004–2014) (2014–2022)		

Rank	Admiral	Vice Admiral	Rear Admiral	Commodore	Senior Officer
Pattern					

=== 2022–present ===
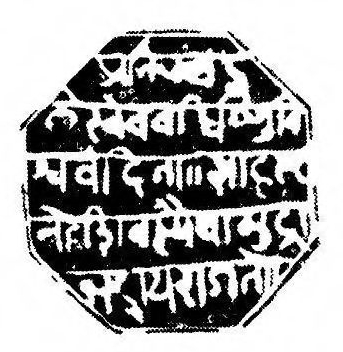
The rajmudra (seal) used by Shivaji I.

In August 2022, the Prime Minister's Office announced that the naval ensign featuring the St. George's Cross would be irrevocably disposed of, in favor of a newer design that would "do away with the colonial past" and befit the "rich Indian maritime heritage". The revised ensign, which happened to be its fourth alteration since 1950, was unveiled for the first time by prime minister Narendra Modi on 2 September, at the commissioning ceremony of aircraft carrier INS Vikrant. Prior to its unveiling, the ensign's revised design, along with the patterns of its distinguishing rank flags, car flags and masthead pennant was accorded presidential approval.

In continuity with the versions introduced after the country's independence, the current ensign features the national flag of India in the canton on a white field. It includes a navy blue-gold octagon in the fly. The octagon is an emulation of a rajmudra (imperial seal) formerly used by Shivaji I - a 17th-century Maratha warrior emperor, who was instrumental in establishing the Maratha Navy, one of the first Indian-origin naval forces of the modern era.

The octagon is furnished with two golden borders and a navy blue background, encompassing the naval crest of the IN - highlighting the State Emblem, mounted atop an anchor superimposed on a naval shield. However, the ensign's crest featured a clear anchor, depicting steadfastness, as opposed to the IN's officially-used crest, which featured a fouled anchor; this disparity was rectified in December 2022 when the IN changed the official-use crest to match the one featured on the naval ensign.

Below the shield, the octagon also features a golden-bordered ribbon bearing the navy's motto in the Devanagari script: शं नो वरुणः (Śhaṁ No Varunaḥ), translated in English as "May the Lord of Water be auspicious unto us". The current ensign bears similarity to the design of the version in service between 2001 and 2004, given both designs have similar portrayals of the naval crest, with the only difference being of the current ensign's display of the navy blue-gold coloured octagon. Additionally, the octagonal shape also represents the eight directions: four cardinal and four inter-cardinal, symbolizing the multidirectional reach and multidimensional operational capability of the IN.

In December 2022, three months after the introduction of the new ensign, President Droupadi Murmu approved the creation of two more naval flags - a Presidential Standard and a Presidential Colour, as honorary acknowledgements to static and mobile naval formations respectively, for distinguished and meritorious service. Both the Presidential Standard and the Presidential Color retain the design of the naval ensign, with the only addition being that of the State Emblem which is placed in the upper fly above the naval crest. The first unit of the IN to bestowed with the new President's Colour was INS Dronacharya, which was conferred with the honour by Murmu on 16 March 2023.

Flag	Jack	Ensign	Commissioning pennant	Presidential colour
Pattern				

Rank	Admiral	Vice Admiral	Rear Admiral	Commodore
Pattern				

== See also ==
=== Naval ensigns of other countries ===
- White Ensign (United Kingdom)
- Australian White Ensign
- New Zealand White Ensign
- Canadian Naval Ensign

=== Others ===
- Indian Navy
- Star of India (flag)
- List of Indian flags
- Naval heraldry
