= List of Indian flags =

This is a list of flags used in India by various organizations.

== National flag ==
Flag	Date	Use	Description
	1947–present	National flag of India	A horizontal tricolour of saffron at the top, white in the middle, and green at the bottom. In the centre is a navy blue wheel with twenty-four spokes, known as the Ashoka Chakra.

== Governmental flag ==
Flag	Date	Use	Description
	1950–1971	Presidential Standard of India	First quarter: state emblem (the Lions of Sarnath) to represent national unity; second quarter: elephant from Ajanta Caves to represent patience and strength; third quarter: scales from the Red Fort, Old Delhi to represent justice and economy; fourth quarter: lotus vase from Sarnath to represent prosperity.
		Flag used by the Ministry of Defence	A horizontal tricolour of red, navy blue, and sky blue representing the army, navy, and air force respectively.

== Supreme Court ==
Flag	Date	Use	Description
	2024–present	Flag used by the Supreme Court of India	A blue field bearing the new emblem of the Supreme Court in gold. The emblem contains an open book, the dome of the Supreme Court, and the Ashoka Chakra.

== Ensigns ==
Flag	Date	Use	Description
		Civil air ensign	India uses the national flag as its civil air ensign
		Civil ensign	A Red Ensign with the flag of India in the canton.
		State ensign	A Blue Ensign with the flag of India in the canton, and a yellow anchor horizontally in the fly.

=== Naval ===
Flag	Date	Use	Description
	2022–present	Indian Naval Ensign	A white field; in the canton, the Indian national flag; in the fly, a blue octagon with golden borders encasing the national emblem atop an anchor to depict steadfastness, superimposed on a shield with the Navy's motto “Sam No Varuna” (a Vedic mantra invoking the god of seas to be auspicious) in Devanagari. The octagon represents the eight directions and has been included as a symbol of the Navy's “multidirectional reach and multidimensional operational capability”. The golden borders of the octagon have been inspired by the seal of Maratha Chhatrapati Shivaji.
		Naval Reserve ensign	Naval Reserve ensign used by auxiliary ships and merchant ships whose captain is a Navy Reserve officer.

=== Port authorities ===
Flag	Date	Use	Description
		Ensign of Port of Cochin	
		Ensign of Bombay Harbour Trust	
		Ensign of Commissioners of the Port of Calcutta	

== Military flags ==
=== Indian Armed Forces ===
Flag	Date	Use	Description
		Flag of the Indian Armed Forces	A horizontal tricolour of red, navy blue, and sky blue with the tri-service emblem at the centre.
		Flag of the Chief of Defence Staff and Chairman Chiefs of Staff Committee	A dark red field with the flag of India in the canton, and the tri-service emblem in the fly.
		Flag of the Integrated Defence Staff and Vice Chief of Defence Staff	A dark red field with the flag of India in the canton, and in the fly an insignia of two crossed swords, an eagle, an anchor and an Ashok symbol above it.

=== Indian Army ===
Flag	Date	Use	Description
		Flag of the Indian Army	A red field with the flag of India in the canton, and the Army badge in the fly.
		Flag of the Field Marshal	A red flag with the national emblem over two crossed batons in a lotus blossom wreath.
		Flag of the Chief of the Army Staff	
		Flag of the General	
		Flag of the Vice Chief of the Army Staff	
		Flag of the Principal Staff Officer	
		Flag of the Lieutenant General	

=== Indian Navy ===
==== Current rank flags (2022–present) ====
Flag	Date	Use	Description
		Flag of the Indian Navy	A white ensign, featuring the flag of India in the canton, and a navy blue filled, gold-bordered octagon, enclosing the crest of the Indian Navy, located in the fly.
		Commissioning pennant of the Indian Navy	A white triangular pennant with a gold-bordered octagon enclosing the crest of the Indian Navy in the hoist.
		President's Colour of the Indian Navy	Indian Naval ensign with State Emblem of India.
		Flag of the Admiral (rank currently reserved for the Chief of the Naval Staff)	A white flag with a gold-bordered octagon enclosing the crest of the Indian Navy in the middle, and four blue stars in the hoist side.
		Flag of the Vice admiral (also Vice Chief of the Naval Staff)	A white flag with a gold-bordered octagon enclosing the crest of the Indian Navy in the middle, and three blue stars in the hoist side.
		Flag of the Rear admiral	A white flag with a gold-bordered octagon enclosing the crest of the Indian Navy in the middle, and two blue stars in the hoist side.
		Flag of the Commodore	A white flag with a gold-bordered octagon enclosing the crest of the Indian Navy in the middle, and one blue star in the hoist side.

==== Former rank flags (1950–2001; 2004–2022) ====
Flag	Date	Use	Description
	1950–2001	Indian Naval Ensign	A red cross on a white field with the Indian national flag in the canton.
	2004–2014	Indian Naval Ensign	A red cross on a white field with the Indian national flag in the canton and the Indian state emblem in yellow at the center.
	2014–2022	Indian Naval Ensign	A red cross on a white field with the Indian national flag in the canton and the Indian state emblem in yellow at the center with the motto Satyameva Jayate below.
	1951–2022	President's Colour	Indian Naval ensign with Presidential Standard elephant in the lower fly quarter.
		Commissioning pennant	A white triangular pennant with St. George's red cross defaced with the Ashoka Chakra at the hoist.
		Flag of the Admiral (was only used by Chief of the Naval Staff)	St. George's Cross defaced with the Ashoka Chakra.
		Flag of the Vice Admiral (also Vice Chief of the Naval Staff)	
		Flag of the Rear Admiral	
		Flag of the Commodore	
		Flag of the Senior officer	

==== Former rank flags (2001–2004) ====
Flag	Date	Use	Description
	2001–2004	Flag of the Indian Navy	A blue-colored crest of the Indian Navy set upon a white background, with the flag of India placed in the canton.
	2001–2004	Commissioning pennant of the Indian Navy	
	2001–2004	Flag of Admiral of the Fleet of the Indian Navy	Never used.
	2001–2004	Flag of Admiral of the Indian Navy	
	2001–2004	Flag of Vice Admiral of the Indian Navy	
	2001–2004	Flag of Rear Admiral of the Indian Navy	
	2001–2004	Flag of Commodore of the Indian Navy	
	2001–2004	Flag of Senior Officer of the Indian Navy	

=== Indian Air Force ===
==== Current rank flags (1980–present) ====
Flag	Date	Use	Description
	2023–	Flag of the Indian Air Force	A sky-blue ensign with the flag of India in the canton, the Air Force roundel in the lower fly, and the IAF badge in the upper fly.
		President's Colour of the Indian Air Force	Air Force ensign with Presidential Standard elephant.
		Flag of the Marshal of the Indian Air Force	Sky blue flag with the badge of the IAF in the center, and five golden five-pointed stars in a vertical line in the fly. Only one person has ever been granted the right to this flag.
		Flag of the Air Chief Marshal (rank currently reserved for the Chief of the Air Staff)	Sky blue flag with the national flag in the canton, the IAF roundel in the lower fly, the IAF badge in the upper fly, and four golden five-pointed stars in a vertical line in the fly.
		Flag of the Air Marshal (also Vice Chief of the Air Staff)	Sky blue flag with IAF roundel in the center surmounted by an eagle; three golden five-pointed stars in a vertical line in the fly.
		Flag of the Air Vice Marshal	Sky blue flag with IAF roundel in the center surmounted by an eagle; two golden five-pointed stars in a vertical line in the fly.
		Flag of the Air Commodore	Sky blue flag with IAF roundel in the center surmounted by an eagle; one golden five-pointed star in the fly.
		Flag of the Group Captain	Sky blue triangular pennant with IAF roundel in the center surmounted by an eagle.
		Flag of the Wing Commander	Sky blue triangular pennant with IAF roundel in the center.

==== Former rank flags (till 2023) ====
Flag	Date	Use	Description
	1950–2023	Flag of the Indian Air Force	A sky blue ensign with the flag of India in the canton, and the Air Force roundel in the fly.
	1980–2023	Flag of the Air Chief Marshal (was only used by Chief of the Air Staff)	Sky blue flag with the national flag in the canton, the IAF roundel in the lower fly, and the IAF badge in the upper fly.

==== Former rank flags (1950–1980) ====
The former IAF rank flags were modeled on those of the Royal Air Force, with different colours.

Flag	Date	Use	Description
	1950–1980	Marshal of the Indian Air Force	Never used.
	1950–1980	Air Chief Marshal of the Indian Air Force	Sky blue bordered with two thick golden yellow stripes and with two thick horizontal green stripes in the center.
	1950–1980	Air Marshal of the Indian Air Force	Sky blue flag bordered with two thick horizontal golden yellow stripes, with one thick horizontal green stripe in the center.
	1950–1980	Air Vice Marshal of the Indian Air Force	Sky blue flag bordered with two thick horizontal golden yellow stripes, with two thin horizontal green stripes in the center.
	1950–1980	Air Commodore of the Indian Air Force	Swallowtail sky blue pennant bordered with two thick horizontal golden yellow stripes, with one thin horizontal green stripe in the center.
	1950–1980	Group Captain of the Indian Air Force	Triangular sky blue pennant bordered in golden yellow, with one thick horizontal green stripe in the center.
	1950–1980	Wing Commander of the Indian Air Force	Triangular sky blue pennant bordered in golden yellow, with two thin horizontal green stripes in the center.
	1950–1980	Squadron Leader of the Indian Air Force	Sky blue flag bordered with two thick horizontal golden yellow stripes, with one thin horizontal green stripe in the center. Above the stripe is an eagle in green. Below the stripe is the squadron number.

=== Coast Guard ===
Flag	Date	Use	Description
		Flag of the Indian Coast Guard, and of the Director General of the Indian Coast Guard	A Blue Ensign with the flag of India in the canton, and the Coast Guard badge in the fly.
		Flag of the Additional Director General of the Indian Coast Guard	A Navy blue flag with Coast Guard badge in the center; three golden five-pointed stars in a vertical line in the fly.
		Flag of Inspector General of the Indian Coast Guard	A Navy blue flag with Coast Guard badge in the center; two golden five-pointed stars in a vertical line in the fly.
		Flag of the Deputy Inspector General of the Indian Coast Guard	A swallowtail black flag with the badge of Indian Coast Guard.
		Flag of the Commandant of the Indian Coast Guard	Black pennant with the badge of Indian Coast Guard in center and a five-pointed silver star in the fly.

=== Paramilitary forces ===
Flag	Date	Use	Description
		Flag of the Assam Rifles	
		Flag of the Rashtriya Rifles	
		Flag of the Central Reserve Police Force	
		Flag of the Central Industrial Security Force	
		Flag of the Railway Protection Force	
		Flag of the Border Security Force	
		Flag of the Sashastra Seema Bal	
		Flag of the Indo-Tibetan Border Police	
		Flag of the National Security Guard	
		Flag of the Special Protection Group	

=== Other agencies ===
Flag	Date	Use	Description
		Flag of the Territorial Army	
		Flag of the National Cadet Corps	
Link to file		Flag of the Border Roads Organisation	

== State and union territory flags ==
At present there are no officially recognised flags for individual states and union territories of India. No legal prohibitions to prevent states adopting distinctive flags exist in either the Emblems and Names (Prevention of Improper Use) Act, 1950 or the Prevention of Insults to National Honour Act, 1971. In a 1994 case before the Supreme Court of India, S. R. Bommai v. Union of India, the Supreme Court declared that there is no prohibition in the Constitution of India for a state to have its own flag. However, a state flag should not dishonour the national flag. The Flag code of India also permits other flags to be flown with the Flag of India, but not on the same flag pole or in a superior position to the national flag.

=== Former official state flags ===
The state of Jammu and Kashmir had an officially recognised state flag between 1952 and 2019 under the special status granted to the state by Article 370 of the Constitution of India.

Flag	State	Date	Description
	Jammu and Kashmir	1947–1952	The flag was red with a plough in the centre. The red background stood for labour and the plough stood for agriculture. The ratio of the flag was 3:2.
	Jammu and Kashmir	1952–2019	The flag was red with three white vertical stripes in the hoist and a plough in the fly. The red background stood for labour, the stripes stood for the three administrative divisions of the state (Jammu, Kashmir, and Ladakh) and the plough stood for agriculture. The ratio of the flag was 3:2.

=== Proposed state flags ===
Flags have been proposed for Tamil Nadu and Karnataka, but neither were officially adopted.

Flag	State	Date	Use	Description
	Tamil Nadu	Proposed in 1970	The Government of Tamil Nadu proposed a design for a state flag in 1970.	Grey flag with the flag of India in the canton and the Emblem of Tamil Nadu in the fly.
	Karnataka	Proposed in 2018	The Government of Karnataka proposed a design for a state flag in 2018.	Yellow, white, and red tricolour with the Emblem of Karnataka centred on the white band.

=== Banners of the states and union territories ===
When a distinctive banner is required to represent a state or union territory, the emblem of the state or union territory is usually displayed on a white or blue field.

== Dominion of India ==
Flag	Date	Use	Description
	1947–1950	Flag of the Dominion of India	A horizontal tricolour of saffron at the top, white in the middle, and green at the bottom. In the centre is a navy blue wheel with twenty-four spokes, known as the Ashoka Chakra.
	1947–1950	Flag of the governor-general of India	Dark blue field emblazoned with the royal crest (a Tudor Crown surmounted by the lion of England, itself wearing the crown), beneath which was the word 'India' in gold majuscules. Similar to flags used by other governors-general of Commonwealth realms.
	1947–present	National flag of India	A horizontal tricolour of saffron at the top, white in the middle, and green at the bottom. In the centre is a navy blue wheel with twenty-four spokes, known as the Ashoka Chakra.

== Political flags ==
=== National parties ===
Party	Flag	Ref.
Aam Aadmi Party		
Bahujan Samaj Party		
Bharatiya Janata Party		
Communist Party of India (Marxist)		
Indian National Congress		
National People's Party		

== House flags ==
Flag	Date	Use	Description
	1919–present	Scindia Steam Navigation Company Ltd.	
	19th century–1952	Bombay Steam Navigation Company	
		Amer Ship Management Ltd., Mumbai	
		Apcar & Co. (Apcar Line)	
		Binny Ship Management Pvt. Ltd.	
		Bombay & Persia S.N. Co., Ltd. Mogul Line	
		Century Shipping Co., Ltd.	
		Chowgule Steamships Ltd., Bombay	
		Damodar Bulk Carriers Ltd.	
		Dempo Steamships Ltd.	
		Essar Shipping Co., Ltd., Bombay	
		Everett (India), Pvt., Ltd.	
		Five Stars Shipping Co. Pte Ltd.	
		Garware Shipping Corp.	
		Great Eastern Shipping Co. Ltd	
		Havers Lines PVT., Ltd., Calcutta	
		Himalaya Shipping Co., Ltd., Calcutta	
		India General Steam Navigation Co.	
		India Steamship Co. Ltd.	
		Indian Co-operative Navigation & Trading Company	
		Indian Shipping Co., Ltd.	
		Indus Container Line	
		Jayshree Teas & Industries Ltd., Calcutta	
		Larsen & Toubro Ltd.	
		Ocean Sparkle Co. Ltd.	
		Sanmar	
		Shipping Corporation of India Ltd.	
		South India Shipping Corp. Ltd.	
		Surrendra Overseas Ltd.	
		Texmaco Ltd.	
		Thakur Shipping Co., Ltd.	
		Tolani Shipping Co., Ltd.	

== Sports ==
Flag	Date	Use	Description
		Flag of the Indian Olympic Association	
		Flag of the Paralympic Committee of India	
		Flag of BCCI	The Board of Control for Cricket in India (BCCI) is the principal national governing body of the sport of cricket in India. It is an autonomous, private organization that does not fall under the purview of the National Sports Federation of India of Government of India and does not receive any grants from the Ministry of Youth Affairs and Sports.
		Flag of the Equestrian Federation of India	

== Educational institutions ==
=== Sainik Schools ===
Flag	Use
	Flag of the Sainik School Society
	Flag of Sainik School Kazhakatoom
	Flag of Sainik School Gopalganj
	Flag of Sainik School Chhingchhip

=== Central universities ===
Flag	Date	Use	Description
		Flag of Aligarh Muslim University	
		Flag of Banaras Hindu University	

== See also ==
- National Flag of India
- Flag of India at Central Park, Connaught Place
- Largest Human Flag of India
- Flags of Indian princely states
- List of Indian state flags
