= Presidential standard of India =

Standard of the president of India
- Use: Small vexillological symbol or pictogram in black and white showing the different uses of the flag
- Adopted: 26 January 1950
- Relinquished: 15 August 1971

The presidential standard of India was a flag flown by the president of India from 1950 to 1971. It succeeded the flag of the governor-general of India (used during the 1947–1950 period of the Dominion of India) on 26 January 1950, when India became a republic. It ceased being used on 15 August 1971, when the president began using the national flag of India.

== Description ==
The standard was a rectangle divided quarterly into blue and red quadrants. Each quadrant was occupied by a national symbols drawn in gold outline. The symbols were:

- 1st quarter: The Lion Capital of Ashoka, which is the State Emblem of India, to represent unity;
- 2nd quarter: A lively Indian elephant from a 5th-century painting of Ajanta Caves, Maharashtra to represent patience and strength;
- 3rd quarter: A weighing scale from the 17th-century Red Fort, Delhi, to represent justice and economy;
- 4th quarter: A vase of Indian lotus from Sarnath, Uttar Pradesh to represent prosperity.

== Related flags ==
Flag of India used by the president of India (1971–present)

== See also ==
- President of India
- Indian flags
