= Bodhgaya inscription of Mahanaman =

Ancient inscription of Buddhist temple in Bodhgaya

Bodh Gayā बोधगया Bodhgayā
- town
- Location within Bihar
- Coordinates: 24.695102°N 84.991275°E
- Country: India
- State: Bihar
- District: Gaya

Population (2001)
  - Total: 30,883

Languages
  - Official: Maithili, Hindi
- Time zone: UTC+5:30 (IST)

The Bodh Gayā inscription of Mahānāman is an epigraphic record documenting the construction of a temple by the Sri Lankan monk Mahānāman at Bodh Gaya in the late sixth century.

== Location ==
Bodh Gayā is located south of Patna in Bihar, India. The shrine built by Mahānāman stood to the north of the Mahabodhi Temple. The inscription, recovered by Alexander Cunningham in the course of his excavations, is reported to be in the Indian Museum; the inked impression used by John Faithfull Fleet is in the collection of the British Museum.

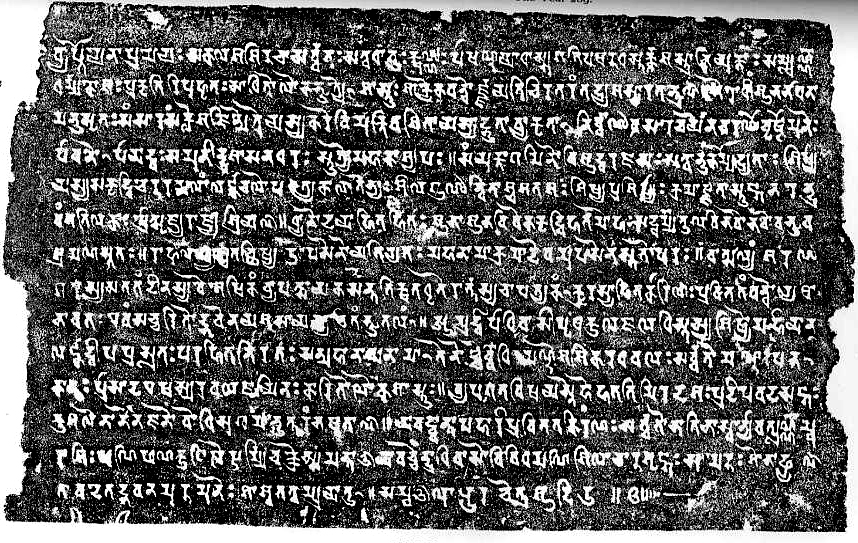
Rubbing of the Bodh Gayā inscription of Mahānāman

== Publication ==
The Bodh Gaya inscription was published by John Faithfull Fleet in 1888. It has subsequently drawn the attention of a number of scholars. Sylvain Lévi reinterpreted the inscription in 1929 in a study that showed the author of the text was familiar with Vasubandhu and the Abhidharmakoṣa. In a complex analysis, Senarath Paranavitana attempted to link the Mahānaman of the inscription with Mahānāman, author of the Mahavamsa, but this interpretation has been rejected by Oskar von Hinüber.

== Description and Contents ==
The inscription records the building of a temple by a monk named Mahānāman. It is dated year 267, in the month of caitra on the 8th day of the śudi fortnight. This date is generally accepted as belonging to the Gupta era and thus refers to 586-87 CE.

== Text ==
The full text is given in The South Asia Inscriptions Database. The purport of the inscription is given in lines 9-11.

9-11) laṅkādvīpaprasūtaḥ ... san mahānāmanāmā tenoccair bbodhimaṇḍe śaśikaradhavalaḥ sarvvato maṇḍapena kāntaḥ prāsāda eṣa smarabalajayinaḥ kārito lokaśāstuḥ

== Translation ==
The purport of the inscription can be translated as follows: This beautiful mansion of the Teacher of mankind, dazzling white as the rays of the moon ... has been caused to be made by him ... whose excellent name was Mahānāman, born in the island of Laṅkā.

== See also ==
- Indian inscriptions
