= Garag =

- Village
- Location in Karnataka, India Garag (India)
- Coordinates: 15°34′30″N 74°55′47″E
- Country: India
- State: Karnataka
- District: Dharwad
- Talukas: Dharwad

Government
  - Type: Panchayat raj
  - Body: Gram panchayat

Population (2011)
  - Total: 10,528

Languages
  - Official: Kannada
- Time zone: UTC+5:30 (IST)
- PIN: 581105
- Telephone code: 0836(phone no.)
- ISO 3166 code: IN-KA
- Vehicle registration: KA
- Nearest city: Dharwad
- Lok Sabha constituency: Dharwad
- Vidhan Sabha constituency: Dharwad[rural]
- Climate: warm (Köppen)
- Website: karnataka.gov.in

Garag is a village in the northern part of Karnataka of India. India. It is located in the Dharwad taluk of Dharwad district in Karnataka.

== Demographics ==
As of the 2011 Census of India there were 2,152 households in Garag and a total population of 10,528 consisting of 5,388 males and 5,140 females. There were 1,281 children ages 0-6.

== Geography ==
Garag is well known for its black soil farm lands. The famous stream Tupri Halla flows nearby. The stream flows only during rainy season. An artificial lake Bokyapur lake is also nearby. Water from Bokyapur lake was used for irrigating agricultural fields. Rare water fowls migrate to Bokyapur during winter months. Very close to the lake is an ancient Lord Hanuman temple which has a Halegannada inscription dating back to 10th or 11th century.

== National Flag of India ==
The hand-woven khadi for the National Flag was initially manufactured at Garag, a small village in Dharwad district in North Karnataka. A center was established at Garag in 1954 by a few freedom fighters under the banner of Dharwad Taluk Kshetriya Seva Sangh and obtained the Centre’s licence to make flags and still it is the only place in India where hand woven Indian national flags are made.

== Education ==
Schools

- Government primary school for boys
- Government primary Urdu School for Muslims
- Government primary school for girls
- Jayakeerthi Primary & High School
- Garag Education Society School
- Garag Vidya Mandir

Colleges

- Sri Guru Madiwaleshwar Pre-university Arts, Commerce & Science College
- Sri Guru Madiwaleshwar Industrial Training Institute
- Sri Guru Madiwaleshwar D.Ed Institute
- Sri Guru Madiwaleshwara BA & Bcom College
- Sri Guru Madiwaleshwar High school

== Banks ==
- STATE BANK OF INDIA
- INDIAN OVERSEAS BANK

== Industries ==
Since 1991 industries have started and they are focusing on automobile sector in Garag region. Most of these industries are located in Belur Industrial Area, few of them are Tata Hitachi Construction Machinery Co. Ltd. (Formerly Telcon. A Tata Motors-Hitachi JV), Tata Motors, Tata Marcopolo Motors, NRE Bharat Coke India, HLL, IAL India, SLN distilleries, MM industries, etc.

There were also chances of getting Tata Nano project to Garag but because of stiff competition from Gujarat state Karnataka lost the fight.

There were also chances of getting Hero Motocorp ltd project to Garag but because of stiff competition from Andhra Pradesh state & Politicians Carelessness Karnataka lost the fight.

Although industries are coming up in Garag area but still the people of Garag are mostly dependent on agriculture.

Near by Garag is Gungaragatti Forest Research Center and Forest Training Center is their and also a tata bus manufacturing plant is also their. .

== Religion ==
Garag is well known for Sri Guru Madiwaleshwar Matta and Temple. Guru Madiwaleshwar was a contemporary of Shishunala Sharif, Siddharudha Swami and other well-known saints of his era. Every year, during February or March, a fair is held which attracts thousands of people. During the fair, overnight prayers are held and visitors are provided free food.

== See also ==
- Kittur
- Dharwad
- Districts of Karnataka
