= Ashoka Chakra =

Symbol used on the Indian flag

Illustration of the Ashoka Chakra, as depicted on the flag of India.

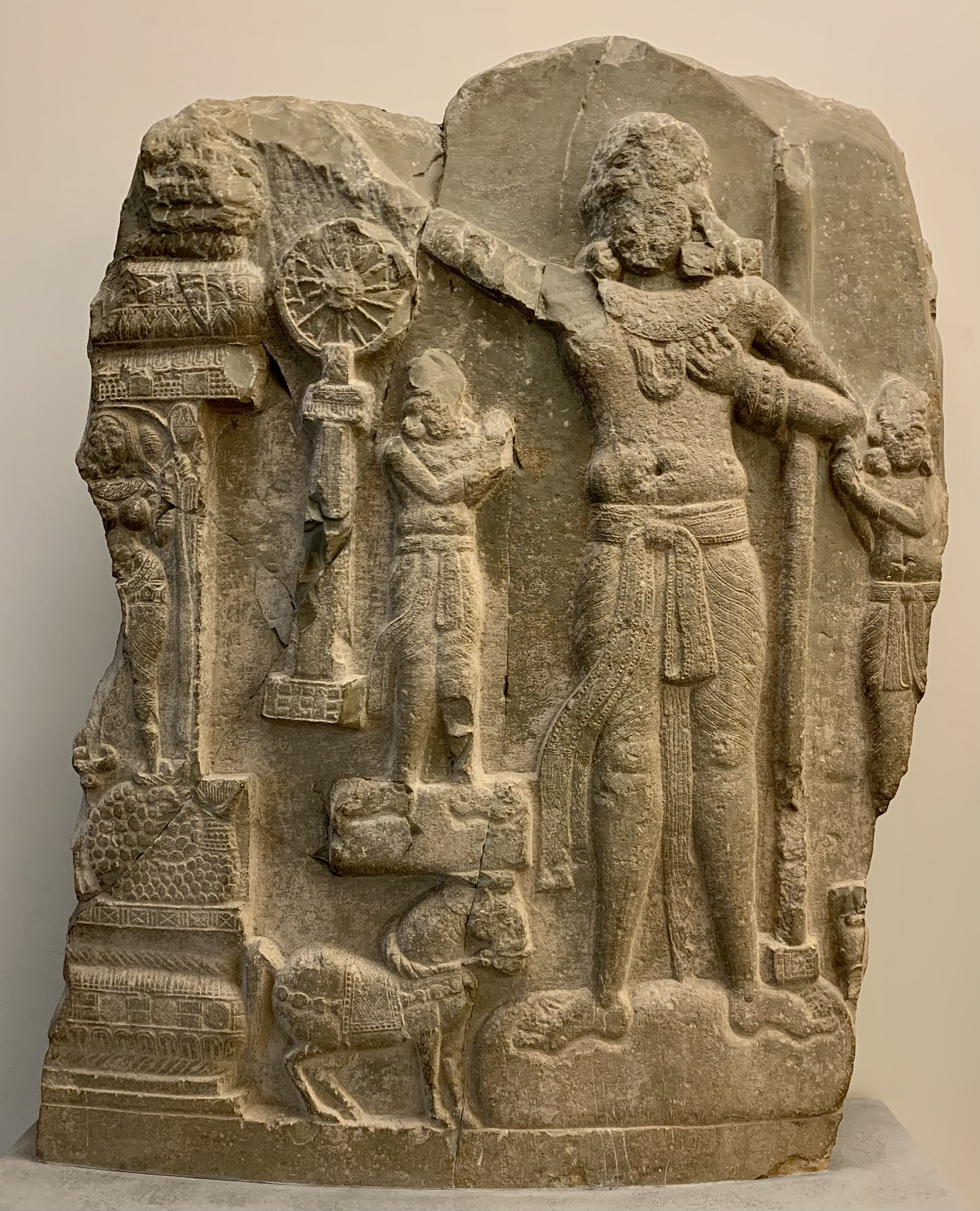
Depiction of a chakravartin, possibly Ashoka, with a 16-spoked wheel (1st century BCE/CE)

The Ashoka Chakra (Transl: Ashoka's wheel) is an Indian symbol which is a depiction of the Dharmachakra. It is called so because it appears on a number of edicts of Ashoka, most prominent among which is the Lion Capital of Ashoka. The most visible use of the Ashoka Chakra today is at the centre of the Flag of India (adopted on 22 July 1947), where it is rendered in a navy blue colour on a white background, replacing the symbol of charkha (spinning wheel) of the pre-independence versions of the flag. It is also shown in the Ashoka Chakra medal, which is the highest award for gallantry in peacetime.

== Symbolic history ==
According to Buddhism, when Gautama Buddha achieved enlightenment at Bodh Gaya, he came to Sarnath. There, he found his five disciples, Assaji, Mahānāman, Kondañña, Bhaddiya and Vappa, who had earlier abandoned him. He introduced his first teachings to them, thereby establishing the Dharmachakra. This is the motif taken up by Ashoka and portrayed on top of his pillars. The Ashoka Pillar in statue discovered, features a chakra with 14 spokes, rather than 24. These spokes are interpreted as symbolizing the fourteen ratnas (jewels) possessed by a Chakravarti, as well as the fourteen Gunasthana in Jain philosophy. In statue Ashoka hand points towards 5th-6th to indicate his own progression levels attributed to a Chakravarti.

The 24 spokes represent the 24 Jain Tirthankara of the present cosmic cycle. Alternatively, the 24 spokes represent the twelve causal links taught by the Buddha and paṭiccasamuppāda (Dependent Origination, Conditional Arising) in forward and then reverse order. The first 12 spokes represent 12 stages of suffering. The next 12 spokes represent no cause no effect. So, due to awareness of the mind, the formation of mental conditioning stops. This process stops the process of birth and death, i.e., nibbāna. It also depicts the “wheel of time”. The twelve causal links, paired with their corresponding symbols, are:

1. Avidyā ignorance
2. Saṅkhāra conditioning of mind unknowingly
3. Vijñāna not being conscious
4. Nāmarūpa name and form (constituent elements of mental and physical existence)
5. Ṣalāyatana six senses (eye, ear, nose, tongue, body, and mind)
6. Sparśa contact
7. Vedanā sensation
8. Taṇhā thirst
9. Upādāna grasping
10. Bhava coming to be
11. Jāti birth
12. Jarāmaraṇa old age and death – corpse being carried.

These 12 in forward and reverse represent a total 24 spokes representing the dharma. The Ashoka Chakra depicts the 24 principles that should be present in a human.

== Inclusion in the national flag of India ==
Ashoka Chakra was included in the middle of the national flag of India. The chakra intends to show that there is life in movement and death in stagnation. Originally, the Indian flag was based on the Swaraj flag, a flag of the Indian National Congress adopted by Mahatma Gandhi after making significant modifications to the design proposed by Pingali Venkayya. This flag included charkha which was replaced with Ashoka Chakra in 1947 by Surayya Tyabji and Badruddin Tyabji

== See also ==
- Buddhist symbolism
- Chakra (disambiguation)
- Dharmachakra
- Vergina Sun
